

471001–471100 

|-bgcolor=#fefefe
| 471001 ||  || — || September 15, 2009 || Mount Lemmon || Mount Lemmon Survey || H || align=right data-sort-value="0.78" | 780 m || 
|-id=002 bgcolor=#fefefe
| 471002 ||  || — || September 27, 2009 || Tzec Maun || L. Elenin || — || align=right data-sort-value="0.89" | 890 m || 
|-id=003 bgcolor=#fefefe
| 471003 ||  || — || September 19, 2009 || Kitt Peak || Spacewatch || — || align=right data-sort-value="0.66" | 660 m || 
|-id=004 bgcolor=#d6d6d6
| 471004 ||  || — || August 27, 2009 || Kitt Peak || Spacewatch || 3:2 || align=right | 4.5 km || 
|-id=005 bgcolor=#fefefe
| 471005 ||  || — || September 17, 2009 || Kitt Peak || Spacewatch || — || align=right data-sort-value="0.95" | 950 m || 
|-id=006 bgcolor=#FA8072
| 471006 ||  || — || September 14, 2009 || Socorro || LINEAR || — || align=right data-sort-value="0.83" | 830 m || 
|-id=007 bgcolor=#fefefe
| 471007 ||  || — || September 25, 2009 || La Sagra || OAM Obs. || — || align=right | 1.1 km || 
|-id=008 bgcolor=#C2FFFF
| 471008 ||  || — || September 16, 2009 || Kitt Peak || Spacewatch || L4 || align=right | 6.9 km || 
|-id=009 bgcolor=#d6d6d6
| 471009 ||  || — || August 16, 2009 || Kitt Peak || Spacewatch || — || align=right | 2.8 km || 
|-id=010 bgcolor=#fefefe
| 471010 ||  || — || October 19, 1995 || Kitt Peak || Spacewatch || — || align=right data-sort-value="0.51" | 510 m || 
|-id=011 bgcolor=#d6d6d6
| 471011 ||  || — || July 25, 2003 || Campo Imperatore || CINEOS || — || align=right | 3.5 km || 
|-id=012 bgcolor=#fefefe
| 471012 ||  || — || October 19, 1998 || Kitt Peak || Spacewatch || V || align=right data-sort-value="0.62" | 620 m || 
|-id=013 bgcolor=#fefefe
| 471013 ||  || — || September 17, 2009 || Kitt Peak || Spacewatch || MAS || align=right data-sort-value="0.69" | 690 m || 
|-id=014 bgcolor=#d6d6d6
| 471014 ||  || — || September 17, 2009 || Kitt Peak || Spacewatch || — || align=right | 2.9 km || 
|-id=015 bgcolor=#fefefe
| 471015 ||  || — || September 25, 2009 || Kitt Peak || Spacewatch || — || align=right data-sort-value="0.71" | 710 m || 
|-id=016 bgcolor=#fefefe
| 471016 ||  || — || September 25, 2009 || Kitt Peak || Spacewatch || — || align=right data-sort-value="0.73" | 730 m || 
|-id=017 bgcolor=#fefefe
| 471017 ||  || — || September 25, 2009 || Kitt Peak || Spacewatch || — || align=right data-sort-value="0.79" | 790 m || 
|-id=018 bgcolor=#fefefe
| 471018 ||  || — || September 25, 2009 || Kitt Peak || Spacewatch || — || align=right data-sort-value="0.71" | 710 m || 
|-id=019 bgcolor=#fefefe
| 471019 ||  || — || September 17, 2009 || Kitt Peak || Spacewatch || — || align=right data-sort-value="0.92" | 920 m || 
|-id=020 bgcolor=#fefefe
| 471020 ||  || — || September 17, 2009 || Kitt Peak || Spacewatch || — || align=right data-sort-value="0.79" | 790 m || 
|-id=021 bgcolor=#fefefe
| 471021 ||  || — || September 25, 2009 || Kitt Peak || Spacewatch || NYS || align=right data-sort-value="0.55" | 550 m || 
|-id=022 bgcolor=#fefefe
| 471022 ||  || — || September 25, 2009 || Kitt Peak || Spacewatch || — || align=right data-sort-value="0.74" | 740 m || 
|-id=023 bgcolor=#fefefe
| 471023 ||  || — || September 19, 2009 || Kitt Peak || Spacewatch || — || align=right data-sort-value="0.87" | 870 m || 
|-id=024 bgcolor=#fefefe
| 471024 ||  || — || August 18, 2009 || Catalina || CSS || V || align=right data-sort-value="0.65" | 650 m || 
|-id=025 bgcolor=#E9E9E9
| 471025 ||  || — || September 29, 2005 || Kitt Peak || Spacewatch || — || align=right | 1.1 km || 
|-id=026 bgcolor=#fefefe
| 471026 ||  || — || September 17, 2009 || Kitt Peak || Spacewatch || — || align=right | 2.0 km || 
|-id=027 bgcolor=#fefefe
| 471027 ||  || — || September 19, 2009 || Kitt Peak || Spacewatch || — || align=right data-sort-value="0.73" | 730 m || 
|-id=028 bgcolor=#fefefe
| 471028 ||  || — || September 17, 2009 || La Sagra || OAM Obs. || V || align=right data-sort-value="0.72" | 720 m || 
|-id=029 bgcolor=#fefefe
| 471029 ||  || — || September 22, 2009 || Kitt Peak || Spacewatch || — || align=right data-sort-value="0.79" | 790 m || 
|-id=030 bgcolor=#fefefe
| 471030 ||  || — || September 25, 2009 || Catalina || CSS || — || align=right data-sort-value="0.88" | 880 m || 
|-id=031 bgcolor=#fefefe
| 471031 ||  || — || September 21, 2009 || Mount Lemmon || Mount Lemmon Survey || — || align=right data-sort-value="0.77" | 770 m || 
|-id=032 bgcolor=#fefefe
| 471032 ||  || — || September 18, 2009 || Kitt Peak || Spacewatch || — || align=right data-sort-value="0.77" | 770 m || 
|-id=033 bgcolor=#fefefe
| 471033 ||  || — || September 18, 2009 || Kitt Peak || Spacewatch || — || align=right data-sort-value="0.75" | 750 m || 
|-id=034 bgcolor=#FFC2E0
| 471034 ||  || — || October 14, 2009 || Mount Lemmon || Mount Lemmon Survey || AMO || align=right data-sort-value="0.49" | 490 m || 
|-id=035 bgcolor=#fefefe
| 471035 ||  || — || September 15, 2009 || Socorro || LINEAR || — || align=right data-sort-value="0.72" | 720 m || 
|-id=036 bgcolor=#fefefe
| 471036 ||  || — || September 27, 2009 || Socorro || LINEAR || — || align=right data-sort-value="0.83" | 830 m || 
|-id=037 bgcolor=#fefefe
| 471037 ||  || — || October 11, 2009 || La Sagra || OAM Obs. || — || align=right | 1.4 km || 
|-id=038 bgcolor=#fefefe
| 471038 ||  || — || October 13, 2009 || La Sagra || OAM Obs. || — || align=right | 1.8 km || 
|-id=039 bgcolor=#fefefe
| 471039 ||  || — || September 22, 2009 || Mount Lemmon || Mount Lemmon Survey || — || align=right data-sort-value="0.80" | 800 m || 
|-id=040 bgcolor=#fefefe
| 471040 ||  || — || October 14, 2009 || La Sagra || OAM Obs. || — || align=right data-sort-value="0.84" | 840 m || 
|-id=041 bgcolor=#fefefe
| 471041 ||  || — || September 21, 2009 || Catalina || CSS || — || align=right data-sort-value="0.73" | 730 m || 
|-id=042 bgcolor=#fefefe
| 471042 ||  || — || September 30, 2009 || Mount Lemmon || Mount Lemmon Survey || — || align=right data-sort-value="0.95" | 950 m || 
|-id=043 bgcolor=#fefefe
| 471043 ||  || — || October 21, 2009 || Catalina || CSS || — || align=right data-sort-value="0.78" | 780 m || 
|-id=044 bgcolor=#fefefe
| 471044 ||  || — || October 22, 2009 || Mount Lemmon || Mount Lemmon Survey || — || align=right data-sort-value="0.77" | 770 m || 
|-id=045 bgcolor=#fefefe
| 471045 ||  || — || October 18, 2009 || Mount Lemmon || Mount Lemmon Survey || MAS || align=right data-sort-value="0.69" | 690 m || 
|-id=046 bgcolor=#fefefe
| 471046 ||  || — || October 18, 2009 || Mount Lemmon || Mount Lemmon Survey || NYS || align=right data-sort-value="0.56" | 560 m || 
|-id=047 bgcolor=#fefefe
| 471047 ||  || — || September 22, 2009 || Mount Lemmon || Mount Lemmon Survey || — || align=right data-sort-value="0.90" | 900 m || 
|-id=048 bgcolor=#fefefe
| 471048 ||  || — || October 23, 2009 || Mount Lemmon || Mount Lemmon Survey || MAS || align=right data-sort-value="0.75" | 750 m || 
|-id=049 bgcolor=#E9E9E9
| 471049 ||  || — || October 23, 2009 || Mount Lemmon || Mount Lemmon Survey || — || align=right | 1.2 km || 
|-id=050 bgcolor=#fefefe
| 471050 ||  || — || October 23, 2009 || Mount Lemmon || Mount Lemmon Survey || — || align=right data-sort-value="0.69" | 690 m || 
|-id=051 bgcolor=#fefefe
| 471051 ||  || — || October 21, 2009 || Catalina || CSS || MAS || align=right data-sort-value="0.73" | 730 m || 
|-id=052 bgcolor=#E9E9E9
| 471052 ||  || — || October 23, 2009 || Mount Lemmon || Mount Lemmon Survey || — || align=right | 1.7 km || 
|-id=053 bgcolor=#fefefe
| 471053 ||  || — || October 22, 2009 || Mount Lemmon || Mount Lemmon Survey || — || align=right data-sort-value="0.81" | 810 m || 
|-id=054 bgcolor=#fefefe
| 471054 ||  || — || October 23, 2009 || Kitt Peak || Spacewatch || MAS || align=right data-sort-value="0.60" | 600 m || 
|-id=055 bgcolor=#fefefe
| 471055 ||  || — || October 23, 2009 || Kitt Peak || Spacewatch || — || align=right data-sort-value="0.71" | 710 m || 
|-id=056 bgcolor=#E9E9E9
| 471056 ||  || — || September 28, 2009 || Mount Lemmon || Mount Lemmon Survey || — || align=right | 3.3 km || 
|-id=057 bgcolor=#fefefe
| 471057 ||  || — || September 18, 2009 || Mount Lemmon || Mount Lemmon Survey || — || align=right data-sort-value="0.67" | 670 m || 
|-id=058 bgcolor=#fefefe
| 471058 ||  || — || October 24, 2009 || Catalina || CSS || H || align=right data-sort-value="0.63" | 630 m || 
|-id=059 bgcolor=#C2FFFF
| 471059 ||  || — || October 18, 2009 || Mount Lemmon || Mount Lemmon Survey || L4 || align=right | 8.5 km || 
|-id=060 bgcolor=#fefefe
| 471060 ||  || — || October 23, 2009 || Kitt Peak || Spacewatch || — || align=right data-sort-value="0.88" | 880 m || 
|-id=061 bgcolor=#fefefe
| 471061 ||  || — || November 6, 2009 || Catalina || CSS || NYS || align=right data-sort-value="0.72" | 720 m || 
|-id=062 bgcolor=#fefefe
| 471062 ||  || — || October 18, 2001 || Socorro || LINEAR || H || align=right data-sort-value="0.78" | 780 m || 
|-id=063 bgcolor=#E9E9E9
| 471063 ||  || — || October 24, 2009 || Kitt Peak || Spacewatch || — || align=right | 2.0 km || 
|-id=064 bgcolor=#fefefe
| 471064 ||  || — || November 11, 2009 || Socorro || LINEAR || H || align=right data-sort-value="0.71" | 710 m || 
|-id=065 bgcolor=#fefefe
| 471065 ||  || — || October 14, 2009 || Mount Lemmon || Mount Lemmon Survey || NYS || align=right data-sort-value="0.57" | 570 m || 
|-id=066 bgcolor=#fefefe
| 471066 ||  || — || November 8, 2009 || Kitt Peak || Spacewatch || MAS || align=right data-sort-value="0.58" | 580 m || 
|-id=067 bgcolor=#fefefe
| 471067 ||  || — || October 16, 2009 || Mount Lemmon || Mount Lemmon Survey || — || align=right data-sort-value="0.72" | 720 m || 
|-id=068 bgcolor=#fefefe
| 471068 ||  || — || November 12, 2009 || La Sagra || OAM Obs. || — || align=right data-sort-value="0.81" | 810 m || 
|-id=069 bgcolor=#fefefe
| 471069 ||  || — || October 18, 2009 || Socorro || LINEAR || — || align=right | 1.2 km || 
|-id=070 bgcolor=#fefefe
| 471070 ||  || — || November 15, 2009 || Catalina || CSS || — || align=right data-sort-value="0.87" | 870 m || 
|-id=071 bgcolor=#fefefe
| 471071 ||  || — || November 23, 1998 || Kitt Peak || Spacewatch || NYS || align=right data-sort-value="0.53" | 530 m || 
|-id=072 bgcolor=#fefefe
| 471072 ||  || — || November 16, 2009 || BlackBird || K. Levin, N. Teamo || — || align=right data-sort-value="0.84" | 840 m || 
|-id=073 bgcolor=#fefefe
| 471073 ||  || — || November 16, 2009 || Kitt Peak || Spacewatch || V || align=right data-sort-value="0.59" | 590 m || 
|-id=074 bgcolor=#fefefe
| 471074 ||  || — || November 18, 2009 || Kitt Peak || Spacewatch || — || align=right data-sort-value="0.83" | 830 m || 
|-id=075 bgcolor=#E9E9E9
| 471075 ||  || — || October 25, 2005 || Kitt Peak || Spacewatch || — || align=right data-sort-value="0.99" | 990 m || 
|-id=076 bgcolor=#fefefe
| 471076 ||  || — || November 19, 2009 || Kitt Peak || Spacewatch || — || align=right data-sort-value="0.76" | 760 m || 
|-id=077 bgcolor=#fefefe
| 471077 ||  || — || November 20, 2009 || Kitt Peak || Spacewatch || — || align=right data-sort-value="0.71" | 710 m || 
|-id=078 bgcolor=#C2FFFF
| 471078 ||  || — || October 27, 2009 || Mount Lemmon || Mount Lemmon Survey || L4 || align=right | 10 km || 
|-id=079 bgcolor=#E9E9E9
| 471079 ||  || — || March 25, 2007 || Mount Lemmon || Mount Lemmon Survey || KON || align=right | 2.1 km || 
|-id=080 bgcolor=#E9E9E9
| 471080 ||  || — || November 23, 2009 || Kitt Peak || Spacewatch || — || align=right | 1.3 km || 
|-id=081 bgcolor=#E9E9E9
| 471081 ||  || — || November 17, 2009 || Catalina || CSS || — || align=right | 1.3 km || 
|-id=082 bgcolor=#E9E9E9
| 471082 ||  || — || November 21, 2009 || Mount Lemmon || Mount Lemmon Survey || — || align=right | 2.1 km || 
|-id=083 bgcolor=#FFC2E0
| 471083 ||  || — || December 12, 2009 || Socorro || LINEAR || APOcritical || align=right data-sort-value="0.24" | 240 m || 
|-id=084 bgcolor=#fefefe
| 471084 ||  || — || December 11, 2009 || Dauban || F. Kugel || — || align=right data-sort-value="0.64" | 640 m || 
|-id=085 bgcolor=#E9E9E9
| 471085 ||  || — || December 15, 2009 || Mount Lemmon || Mount Lemmon Survey || — || align=right | 1.1 km || 
|-id=086 bgcolor=#E9E9E9
| 471086 ||  || — || December 17, 2009 || Mount Lemmon || Mount Lemmon Survey || MAR || align=right | 1.4 km || 
|-id=087 bgcolor=#E9E9E9
| 471087 ||  || — || December 17, 2009 || Mount Lemmon || Mount Lemmon Survey || ADE || align=right | 2.1 km || 
|-id=088 bgcolor=#E9E9E9
| 471088 ||  || — || November 23, 2009 || Mount Lemmon || Mount Lemmon Survey || — || align=right | 1.7 km || 
|-id=089 bgcolor=#E9E9E9
| 471089 ||  || — || December 19, 2009 || Kitt Peak || Spacewatch || — || align=right data-sort-value="0.92" | 920 m || 
|-id=090 bgcolor=#E9E9E9
| 471090 ||  || — || January 6, 2010 || Kitt Peak || Spacewatch || — || align=right | 2.8 km || 
|-id=091 bgcolor=#E9E9E9
| 471091 ||  || — || January 7, 2010 || Kitt Peak || Spacewatch || — || align=right | 1.4 km || 
|-id=092 bgcolor=#E9E9E9
| 471092 ||  || — || October 26, 2009 || Kitt Peak || Spacewatch || — || align=right | 2.0 km || 
|-id=093 bgcolor=#E9E9E9
| 471093 ||  || — || December 27, 2009 || Kitt Peak || Spacewatch || — || align=right | 1.6 km || 
|-id=094 bgcolor=#E9E9E9
| 471094 ||  || — || January 8, 2010 || Kitt Peak || Spacewatch || — || align=right | 2.5 km || 
|-id=095 bgcolor=#E9E9E9
| 471095 ||  || — || December 15, 2009 || Catalina || CSS || — || align=right | 1.6 km || 
|-id=096 bgcolor=#fefefe
| 471096 ||  || — || January 6, 2010 || Kitt Peak || Spacewatch || H || align=right data-sort-value="0.69" | 690 m || 
|-id=097 bgcolor=#E9E9E9
| 471097 ||  || — || November 11, 2009 || Mount Lemmon || Mount Lemmon Survey || — || align=right | 1.1 km || 
|-id=098 bgcolor=#d6d6d6
| 471098 ||  || — || January 8, 2010 || Mount Lemmon || Mount Lemmon Survey || — || align=right | 2.7 km || 
|-id=099 bgcolor=#d6d6d6
| 471099 ||  || — || January 12, 2010 || WISE || WISE || — || align=right | 4.0 km || 
|-id=100 bgcolor=#d6d6d6
| 471100 ||  || — || January 12, 2010 || WISE || WISE || — || align=right | 3.4 km || 
|}

471101–471200 

|-bgcolor=#E9E9E9
| 471101 ||  || — || January 12, 2010 || WISE || WISE || — || align=right | 3.1 km || 
|-id=102 bgcolor=#E9E9E9
| 471102 ||  || — || January 16, 2010 || Bisei SG Center || BATTeRS || — || align=right | 2.4 km || 
|-id=103 bgcolor=#d6d6d6
| 471103 ||  || — || January 16, 2010 || WISE || WISE || — || align=right | 2.7 km || 
|-id=104 bgcolor=#d6d6d6
| 471104 ||  || — || January 19, 2010 || WISE || WISE || — || align=right | 3.7 km || 
|-id=105 bgcolor=#d6d6d6
| 471105 ||  || — || June 16, 2005 || Kitt Peak || Spacewatch || — || align=right | 5.1 km || 
|-id=106 bgcolor=#d6d6d6
| 471106 ||  || — || January 23, 2010 || WISE || WISE || — || align=right | 4.1 km || 
|-id=107 bgcolor=#d6d6d6
| 471107 ||  || — || January 27, 2010 || WISE || WISE || — || align=right | 4.0 km || 
|-id=108 bgcolor=#FFC2E0
| 471108 ||  || — || February 9, 2010 || Catalina || CSS || AMO || align=right data-sort-value="0.46" | 460 m || 
|-id=109 bgcolor=#E9E9E9
| 471109 Vladobahýl ||  ||  || February 12, 2010 || Mayhill || S. Kürti || (5) || align=right data-sort-value="0.80" | 800 m || 
|-id=110 bgcolor=#E9E9E9
| 471110 ||  || — || December 17, 2009 || Mount Lemmon || Mount Lemmon Survey || ADE || align=right | 2.1 km || 
|-id=111 bgcolor=#E9E9E9
| 471111 ||  || — || January 11, 2010 || Kitt Peak || Spacewatch || — || align=right | 1.9 km || 
|-id=112 bgcolor=#E9E9E9
| 471112 ||  || — || January 12, 2010 || Kitt Peak || Spacewatch || — || align=right | 2.0 km || 
|-id=113 bgcolor=#d6d6d6
| 471113 ||  || — || August 10, 2007 || Kitt Peak || Spacewatch || — || align=right | 3.9 km || 
|-id=114 bgcolor=#E9E9E9
| 471114 ||  || — || January 6, 2010 || Kitt Peak || Spacewatch || — || align=right | 1.8 km || 
|-id=115 bgcolor=#E9E9E9
| 471115 ||  || — || March 10, 2002 || Kitt Peak || Spacewatch || — || align=right | 1.7 km || 
|-id=116 bgcolor=#E9E9E9
| 471116 ||  || — || January 11, 2010 || Kitt Peak || Spacewatch || — || align=right data-sort-value="0.92" | 920 m || 
|-id=117 bgcolor=#E9E9E9
| 471117 ||  || — || February 14, 2010 || Kitt Peak || Spacewatch || — || align=right | 2.4 km || 
|-id=118 bgcolor=#E9E9E9
| 471118 ||  || — || September 23, 2008 || Mount Lemmon || Mount Lemmon Survey || — || align=right | 1.8 km || 
|-id=119 bgcolor=#fefefe
| 471119 ||  || — || February 15, 2010 || Kitt Peak || Spacewatch || H || align=right data-sort-value="0.69" | 690 m || 
|-id=120 bgcolor=#E9E9E9
| 471120 ||  || — || February 9, 2010 || Kitt Peak || Spacewatch || — || align=right | 2.2 km || 
|-id=121 bgcolor=#E9E9E9
| 471121 ||  || — || February 6, 2010 || Mount Lemmon || Mount Lemmon Survey || — || align=right | 2.1 km || 
|-id=122 bgcolor=#E9E9E9
| 471122 ||  || — || February 15, 2010 || Catalina || CSS || — || align=right | 1.5 km || 
|-id=123 bgcolor=#d6d6d6
| 471123 ||  || — || February 2, 2010 || WISE || WISE || — || align=right | 2.3 km || 
|-id=124 bgcolor=#d6d6d6
| 471124 ||  || — || December 5, 2007 || Mount Lemmon || Mount Lemmon Survey || — || align=right | 4.9 km || 
|-id=125 bgcolor=#E9E9E9
| 471125 ||  || — || January 15, 2010 || Mount Lemmon || Mount Lemmon Survey || — || align=right | 1.5 km || 
|-id=126 bgcolor=#d6d6d6
| 471126 ||  || — || January 7, 2010 || Kitt Peak || Spacewatch || — || align=right | 2.8 km || 
|-id=127 bgcolor=#E9E9E9
| 471127 ||  || — || February 13, 2010 || Mount Lemmon || Mount Lemmon Survey || — || align=right | 1.2 km || 
|-id=128 bgcolor=#E9E9E9
| 471128 ||  || — || February 15, 2010 || WISE || WISE || — || align=right | 4.7 km || 
|-id=129 bgcolor=#E9E9E9
| 471129 ||  || — || February 16, 2010 || Kitt Peak || Spacewatch || — || align=right | 2.5 km || 
|-id=130 bgcolor=#d6d6d6
| 471130 ||  || — || February 17, 2010 || Kitt Peak || Spacewatch || EOS || align=right | 1.5 km || 
|-id=131 bgcolor=#d6d6d6
| 471131 ||  || — || February 21, 2010 || WISE || WISE || — || align=right | 2.9 km || 
|-id=132 bgcolor=#E9E9E9
| 471132 ||  || — || February 16, 2010 || Kitt Peak || Spacewatch || — || align=right | 1.9 km || 
|-id=133 bgcolor=#d6d6d6
| 471133 ||  || — || March 4, 2010 || WISE || WISE || — || align=right | 3.8 km || 
|-id=134 bgcolor=#fefefe
| 471134 ||  || — || March 5, 2010 || Catalina || CSS || H || align=right data-sort-value="0.81" | 810 m || 
|-id=135 bgcolor=#d6d6d6
| 471135 ||  || — || March 10, 2010 || WISE || WISE || — || align=right | 3.7 km || 
|-id=136 bgcolor=#C7FF8F
| 471136 ||  || — || March 9, 2010 || La Silla || D. L. Rabinowitz, S. Tourtellotte || centaurcritical || align=right | 56 km || 
|-id=137 bgcolor=#C2E0FF
| 471137 ||  || — || March 13, 2010 || La Silla || D. L. Rabinowitz, S. Tourtellotte || SDO || align=right | 393 km || 
|-id=138 bgcolor=#E9E9E9
| 471138 ||  || — || March 13, 2010 || Siding Spring || SSS || — || align=right | 3.0 km || 
|-id=139 bgcolor=#fefefe
| 471139 ||  || — || February 14, 2010 || Kitt Peak || Spacewatch || H || align=right data-sort-value="0.47" | 470 m || 
|-id=140 bgcolor=#E9E9E9
| 471140 ||  || — || February 16, 2010 || Siding Spring || SSS || — || align=right | 2.0 km || 
|-id=141 bgcolor=#E9E9E9
| 471141 ||  || — || March 13, 2010 || Kitt Peak || Spacewatch || — || align=right | 1.5 km || 
|-id=142 bgcolor=#E9E9E9
| 471142 ||  || — || February 16, 2010 || Kitt Peak || Spacewatch || — || align=right | 1.5 km || 
|-id=143 bgcolor=#C2E0FF
| 471143 Dziewanna ||  ||  || March 13, 2010 || Las Campanas || A. Udalski, S. S. Sheppard, M. Kubiak, C. Trujillo || res2:7critical || align=right | 686 km || 
|-id=144 bgcolor=#E9E9E9
| 471144 ||  || — || May 20, 2006 || Mount Lemmon || Mount Lemmon Survey || AST || align=right | 1.6 km || 
|-id=145 bgcolor=#E9E9E9
| 471145 ||  || — || February 19, 2010 || Catalina || CSS || — || align=right | 2.2 km || 
|-id=146 bgcolor=#d6d6d6
| 471146 ||  || — || March 16, 2010 || Mount Lemmon || Mount Lemmon Survey || — || align=right | 2.4 km || 
|-id=147 bgcolor=#E9E9E9
| 471147 ||  || — || March 16, 2010 || Kitt Peak || Spacewatch || — || align=right | 1.3 km || 
|-id=148 bgcolor=#d6d6d6
| 471148 ||  || — || February 16, 2010 || Mount Lemmon || Mount Lemmon Survey || — || align=right | 2.8 km || 
|-id=149 bgcolor=#C7FF8F
| 471149 ||  || — || March 17, 2010 || La Silla || D. L. Rabinowitz, S. Tourtellotte || centaur || align=right | 141 km || 
|-id=150 bgcolor=#C2E0FF
| 471150 ||  || — || March 18, 2010 || La Silla || D. L. Rabinowitz, S. Tourtellotte || other TNO || align=right | 295 km || 
|-id=151 bgcolor=#C2E0FF
| 471151 ||  || — || March 19, 2010 || La Silla || D. L. Rabinowitz, S. Tourtellotte || res2:5 || align=right | 226 km || 
|-id=152 bgcolor=#C2E0FF
| 471152 ||  || — || March 19, 2010 || La Silla || D. L. Rabinowitz, S. Tourtellotte || SDOcritical || align=right | 222 km || 
|-id=153 bgcolor=#E9E9E9
| 471153 ||  || — || March 16, 2010 || Kitt Peak || Spacewatch || — || align=right | 2.3 km || 
|-id=154 bgcolor=#d6d6d6
| 471154 ||  || — || March 18, 2010 || Kitt Peak || Spacewatch || — || align=right | 2.9 km || 
|-id=155 bgcolor=#C2E0FF
| 471155 ||  || — || April 14, 2010 || La Silla || D. L. Rabinowitz, S. Tourtellotte || centaurcritical || align=right | 168 km || 
|-id=156 bgcolor=#d6d6d6
| 471156 ||  || — || April 14, 2010 || WISE || WISE || Tj (2.98) || align=right | 5.2 km || 
|-id=157 bgcolor=#E9E9E9
| 471157 ||  || — || April 8, 2010 || Kitt Peak || Spacewatch || — || align=right | 2.1 km || 
|-id=158 bgcolor=#d6d6d6
| 471158 ||  || — || April 9, 2010 || Mount Lemmon || Mount Lemmon Survey || — || align=right | 2.7 km || 
|-id=159 bgcolor=#d6d6d6
| 471159 ||  || — || April 15, 2010 || WISE || WISE || — || align=right | 5.1 km || 
|-id=160 bgcolor=#E9E9E9
| 471160 ||  || — || October 7, 2008 || Mount Lemmon || Mount Lemmon Survey || — || align=right | 1.6 km || 
|-id=161 bgcolor=#d6d6d6
| 471161 ||  || — || April 17, 2010 || WISE || WISE || Tj (2.99) || align=right | 4.1 km || 
|-id=162 bgcolor=#d6d6d6
| 471162 ||  || — || June 1, 2005 || Mount Lemmon || Mount Lemmon Survey || Tj (2.97) || align=right | 2.4 km || 
|-id=163 bgcolor=#d6d6d6
| 471163 ||  || — || April 25, 2010 || WISE || WISE || — || align=right | 4.2 km || 
|-id=164 bgcolor=#d6d6d6
| 471164 ||  || — || April 25, 2010 || WISE || WISE || — || align=right | 4.8 km || 
|-id=165 bgcolor=#C2E0FF
| 471165 ||  || — || April 21, 2010 || Las Campanas || S. S. Sheppard, R. Poleski, A. Udalski, C. Trujillo || other TNOmoon || align=right | 384 km || 
|-id=166 bgcolor=#d6d6d6
| 471166 ||  || — || April 26, 2010 || Mount Lemmon || Mount Lemmon Survey || EOS || align=right | 1.7 km || 
|-id=167 bgcolor=#d6d6d6
| 471167 ||  || — || April 25, 2010 || Mount Lemmon || Mount Lemmon Survey || — || align=right | 2.7 km || 
|-id=168 bgcolor=#d6d6d6
| 471168 ||  || — || May 1, 2010 || WISE || WISE || — || align=right | 5.4 km || 
|-id=169 bgcolor=#d6d6d6
| 471169 ||  || — || May 4, 2010 || WISE || WISE || Tj (2.99) || align=right | 4.6 km || 
|-id=170 bgcolor=#d6d6d6
| 471170 ||  || — || September 18, 2006 || Kitt Peak || Spacewatch || — || align=right | 2.0 km || 
|-id=171 bgcolor=#d6d6d6
| 471171 ||  || — || May 3, 2010 || Kitt Peak || Spacewatch || — || align=right | 2.9 km || 
|-id=172 bgcolor=#C2E0FF
| 471172 ||  || — || May 12, 2010 || La Silla || D. L. Rabinowitz, S. Tourtellotte || res2:5critical || align=right | 263 km || 
|-id=173 bgcolor=#d6d6d6
| 471173 ||  || — || January 24, 2010 || WISE || WISE || — || align=right | 2.8 km || 
|-id=174 bgcolor=#d6d6d6
| 471174 ||  || — || February 17, 2004 || Kitt Peak || Spacewatch || — || align=right | 2.8 km || 
|-id=175 bgcolor=#d6d6d6
| 471175 ||  || — || May 13, 2010 || WISE || WISE || — || align=right | 3.6 km || 
|-id=176 bgcolor=#d6d6d6
| 471176 ||  || — || April 20, 2010 || Kitt Peak || Spacewatch || — || align=right | 2.8 km || 
|-id=177 bgcolor=#d6d6d6
| 471177 ||  || — || May 9, 2010 || Mount Lemmon || Mount Lemmon Survey || — || align=right | 1.9 km || 
|-id=178 bgcolor=#d6d6d6
| 471178 ||  || — || May 13, 2010 || Kitt Peak || Spacewatch || EOS || align=right | 1.7 km || 
|-id=179 bgcolor=#d6d6d6
| 471179 ||  || — || May 17, 2010 || WISE || WISE || 7:4*critical || align=right | 2.9 km || 
|-id=180 bgcolor=#d6d6d6
| 471180 ||  || — || May 18, 2010 || WISE || WISE || — || align=right | 3.6 km || 
|-id=181 bgcolor=#d6d6d6
| 471181 ||  || — || May 19, 2010 || WISE || WISE || Tj (2.99) || align=right | 3.9 km || 
|-id=182 bgcolor=#d6d6d6
| 471182 ||  || — || September 22, 2004 || Anderson Mesa || LONEOS || 7:4* || align=right | 2.9 km || 
|-id=183 bgcolor=#d6d6d6
| 471183 ||  || — || February 24, 2010 || WISE || WISE || — || align=right | 2.4 km || 
|-id=184 bgcolor=#d6d6d6
| 471184 ||  || — || July 3, 2005 || Mount Lemmon || Mount Lemmon Survey || — || align=right | 2.5 km || 
|-id=185 bgcolor=#fefefe
| 471185 ||  || — || February 25, 2007 || Catalina || CSS || H || align=right | 1.1 km || 
|-id=186 bgcolor=#E9E9E9
| 471186 ||  || — || January 1, 2009 || Kitt Peak || Spacewatch || — || align=right | 3.1 km || 
|-id=187 bgcolor=#d6d6d6
| 471187 ||  || — || March 19, 2009 || Kitt Peak || Spacewatch || THM || align=right | 2.5 km || 
|-id=188 bgcolor=#d6d6d6
| 471188 ||  || — || July 2, 2010 || WISE || WISE || — || align=right | 2.8 km || 
|-id=189 bgcolor=#d6d6d6
| 471189 ||  || — || July 2, 2010 || WISE || WISE || — || align=right | 3.9 km || 
|-id=190 bgcolor=#d6d6d6
| 471190 ||  || — || July 10, 2010 || WISE || WISE || SYL7:4 || align=right | 5.2 km || 
|-id=191 bgcolor=#d6d6d6
| 471191 ||  || — || July 1, 2010 || WISE || WISE || 7:4 || align=right | 4.3 km || 
|-id=192 bgcolor=#d6d6d6
| 471192 ||  || — || May 24, 2010 || Mount Lemmon || Mount Lemmon Survey || — || align=right | 3.6 km || 
|-id=193 bgcolor=#d6d6d6
| 471193 ||  || — || February 1, 2010 || WISE || WISE || — || align=right | 4.0 km || 
|-id=194 bgcolor=#d6d6d6
| 471194 ||  || — || February 3, 2010 || WISE || WISE || — || align=right | 4.0 km || 
|-id=195 bgcolor=#d6d6d6
| 471195 ||  || — || March 20, 2007 || Kitt Peak || Spacewatch || 7:4 || align=right | 4.3 km || 
|-id=196 bgcolor=#C2E0FF
| 471196 ||  || — || August 14, 2010 || La Silla || D. L. Rabinowitz, M. E. Schwamb, S. Tourtellotte || cubewano (hot) || align=right | 328 km || 
|-id=197 bgcolor=#fefefe
| 471197 ||  || — || September 15, 2007 || Mount Lemmon || Mount Lemmon Survey || — || align=right data-sort-value="0.54" | 540 m || 
|-id=198 bgcolor=#fefefe
| 471198 ||  || — || September 4, 2010 || Kitt Peak || Spacewatch || — || align=right data-sort-value="0.60" | 600 m || 
|-id=199 bgcolor=#FA8072
| 471199 ||  || — || September 15, 2007 || Mount Lemmon || Mount Lemmon Survey || — || align=right data-sort-value="0.57" | 570 m || 
|-id=200 bgcolor=#fefefe
| 471200 ||  || — || September 28, 1997 || Kitt Peak || Spacewatch || — || align=right data-sort-value="0.60" | 600 m || 
|}

471201–471300 

|-bgcolor=#d6d6d6
| 471201 ||  || — || September 11, 2010 || Kitt Peak || Spacewatch || VER || align=right | 2.6 km || 
|-id=202 bgcolor=#d6d6d6
| 471202 ||  || — || September 14, 2010 || Kitt Peak || Spacewatch || EOS || align=right | 1.6 km || 
|-id=203 bgcolor=#fefefe
| 471203 ||  || — || September 10, 2010 || Kitt Peak || Spacewatch || — || align=right data-sort-value="0.65" | 650 m || 
|-id=204 bgcolor=#fefefe
| 471204 ||  || — || September 16, 2010 || Mount Lemmon || Mount Lemmon Survey || — || align=right data-sort-value="0.57" | 570 m || 
|-id=205 bgcolor=#fefefe
| 471205 ||  || — || December 14, 2007 || Kitt Peak || Spacewatch || — || align=right data-sort-value="0.63" | 630 m || 
|-id=206 bgcolor=#fefefe
| 471206 ||  || — || October 17, 2010 || Mount Lemmon || Mount Lemmon Survey || — || align=right data-sort-value="0.65" | 650 m || 
|-id=207 bgcolor=#fefefe
| 471207 ||  || — || January 15, 2008 || Mount Lemmon || Mount Lemmon Survey || — || align=right data-sort-value="0.70" | 700 m || 
|-id=208 bgcolor=#fefefe
| 471208 ||  || — || October 29, 2010 || Kitt Peak || Spacewatch || — || align=right data-sort-value="0.54" | 540 m || 
|-id=209 bgcolor=#fefefe
| 471209 ||  || — || November 14, 1999 || Socorro || LINEAR || — || align=right | 1.0 km || 
|-id=210 bgcolor=#C2E0FF
| 471210 ||  || — || November 3, 2010 || La Silla || D. L. Rabinowitz, M. E. Schwamb, S. Tourtellotte || SDO || align=right | 349 km || 
|-id=211 bgcolor=#d6d6d6
| 471211 ||  || — || November 1, 2010 || Kitt Peak || Spacewatch || — || align=right | 2.4 km || 
|-id=212 bgcolor=#fefefe
| 471212 ||  || — || November 4, 2010 || Socorro || LINEAR || — || align=right data-sort-value="0.68" | 680 m || 
|-id=213 bgcolor=#fefefe
| 471213 ||  || — || December 16, 2007 || Mount Lemmon || Mount Lemmon Survey || — || align=right data-sort-value="0.51" | 510 m || 
|-id=214 bgcolor=#C2FFFF
| 471214 ||  || — || November 7, 2010 || Kitt Peak || Spacewatch || L4 || align=right | 9.4 km || 
|-id=215 bgcolor=#C2FFFF
| 471215 ||  || — || November 16, 2009 || Mount Lemmon || Mount Lemmon Survey || L4 || align=right | 7.9 km || 
|-id=216 bgcolor=#FA8072
| 471216 ||  || — || November 10, 2010 || Kitt Peak || Spacewatch || critical || align=right data-sort-value="0.47" | 470 m || 
|-id=217 bgcolor=#fefefe
| 471217 ||  || — || November 11, 2010 || Mount Lemmon || Mount Lemmon Survey || — || align=right data-sort-value="0.59" | 590 m || 
|-id=218 bgcolor=#fefefe
| 471218 ||  || — || October 31, 2010 || Kitt Peak || Spacewatch || — || align=right data-sort-value="0.66" | 660 m || 
|-id=219 bgcolor=#fefefe
| 471219 ||  || — || November 8, 2010 || Kitt Peak || Spacewatch || — || align=right data-sort-value="0.73" | 730 m || 
|-id=220 bgcolor=#fefefe
| 471220 ||  || — || August 18, 2003 || Campo Imperatore || CINEOS || — || align=right data-sort-value="0.62" | 620 m || 
|-id=221 bgcolor=#fefefe
| 471221 ||  || — || October 29, 2010 || Mount Lemmon || Mount Lemmon Survey || — || align=right data-sort-value="0.82" | 820 m || 
|-id=222 bgcolor=#fefefe
| 471222 ||  || — || March 30, 2008 || Catalina || CSS || — || align=right | 1.1 km || 
|-id=223 bgcolor=#fefefe
| 471223 ||  || — || July 3, 2005 || Mount Lemmon || Mount Lemmon Survey || — || align=right | 1.3 km || 
|-id=224 bgcolor=#fefefe
| 471224 ||  || — || October 31, 2010 || Kitt Peak || Spacewatch || — || align=right data-sort-value="0.76" | 760 m || 
|-id=225 bgcolor=#fefefe
| 471225 ||  || — || December 14, 2010 || Mount Lemmon || Mount Lemmon Survey || — || align=right data-sort-value="0.73" | 730 m || 
|-id=226 bgcolor=#E9E9E9
| 471226 ||  || — || December 11, 2010 || Mount Lemmon || Mount Lemmon Survey || — || align=right | 1.3 km || 
|-id=227 bgcolor=#fefefe
| 471227 ||  || — || January 8, 2011 || Mount Lemmon || Mount Lemmon Survey || NYS || align=right data-sort-value="0.73" | 730 m || 
|-id=228 bgcolor=#d6d6d6
| 471228 ||  || — || January 4, 2011 || Catalina || CSS || Tj (2.98) || align=right | 3.4 km || 
|-id=229 bgcolor=#fefefe
| 471229 ||  || — || October 12, 2010 || Kitt Peak || Spacewatch || V || align=right data-sort-value="0.75" | 750 m || 
|-id=230 bgcolor=#fefefe
| 471230 ||  || — || September 17, 2009 || Catalina || CSS || V || align=right data-sort-value="0.70" | 700 m || 
|-id=231 bgcolor=#E9E9E9
| 471231 ||  || — || January 12, 2011 || Mount Lemmon || Mount Lemmon Survey || — || align=right | 1.4 km || 
|-id=232 bgcolor=#fefefe
| 471232 ||  || — || October 21, 2006 || Kitt Peak || Spacewatch || — || align=right data-sort-value="0.73" | 730 m || 
|-id=233 bgcolor=#d6d6d6
| 471233 ||  || — || January 14, 2011 || Kitt Peak || Spacewatch || Tj (2.99) || align=right | 3.6 km || 
|-id=234 bgcolor=#E9E9E9
| 471234 ||  || — || January 10, 2011 || Kitt Peak || Spacewatch || — || align=right | 3.2 km || 
|-id=235 bgcolor=#fefefe
| 471235 ||  || — || December 8, 2010 || Mount Lemmon || Mount Lemmon Survey || — || align=right data-sort-value="0.67" | 670 m || 
|-id=236 bgcolor=#E9E9E9
| 471236 ||  || — || December 6, 2010 || Mount Lemmon || Mount Lemmon Survey || — || align=right | 1.2 km || 
|-id=237 bgcolor=#C7FF8F
| 471237 ||  || — || January 3, 2011 || Mount Lemmon || Mount Lemmon Survey || centaurcritical || align=right | 29 km || 
|-id=238 bgcolor=#fefefe
| 471238 ||  || — || January 16, 2011 || Mount Lemmon || Mount Lemmon Survey || — || align=right data-sort-value="0.68" | 680 m || 
|-id=239 bgcolor=#E9E9E9
| 471239 ||  || — || December 2, 2010 || Kitt Peak || Spacewatch || — || align=right | 2.5 km || 
|-id=240 bgcolor=#FFC2E0
| 471240 ||  || — || January 24, 2011 || Haleakala || Pan-STARRS || APOPHAfast || align=right data-sort-value="0.16" | 160 m || 
|-id=241 bgcolor=#FFC2E0
| 471241 ||  || — || January 26, 2011 || Mount Lemmon || Mount Lemmon Survey || APO +1kmPHA || align=right | 1.5 km || 
|-id=242 bgcolor=#FA8072
| 471242 ||  || — || January 14, 2011 || Kitt Peak || Spacewatch || — || align=right data-sort-value="0.65" | 650 m || 
|-id=243 bgcolor=#fefefe
| 471243 ||  || — || January 25, 2011 || Kitt Peak || Spacewatch || — || align=right data-sort-value="0.71" | 710 m || 
|-id=244 bgcolor=#E9E9E9
| 471244 ||  || — || January 28, 2011 || Mount Lemmon || Mount Lemmon Survey || EUN || align=right data-sort-value="0.98" | 980 m || 
|-id=245 bgcolor=#fefefe
| 471245 ||  || — || January 25, 2011 || Mount Lemmon || Mount Lemmon Survey || — || align=right data-sort-value="0.94" | 940 m || 
|-id=246 bgcolor=#fefefe
| 471246 ||  || — || January 16, 2011 || Mount Lemmon || Mount Lemmon Survey || — || align=right data-sort-value="0.84" | 840 m || 
|-id=247 bgcolor=#fefefe
| 471247 ||  || — || November 15, 2006 || Catalina || CSS || (2076) || align=right data-sort-value="0.75" | 750 m || 
|-id=248 bgcolor=#fefefe
| 471248 ||  || — || December 29, 2003 || Kitt Peak || Spacewatch || — || align=right data-sort-value="0.77" | 770 m || 
|-id=249 bgcolor=#fefefe
| 471249 ||  || — || January 13, 2011 || Kitt Peak || Spacewatch || — || align=right data-sort-value="0.62" | 620 m || 
|-id=250 bgcolor=#fefefe
| 471250 ||  || — || January 28, 2011 || Mount Lemmon || Mount Lemmon Survey || NYS || align=right data-sort-value="0.60" | 600 m || 
|-id=251 bgcolor=#fefefe
| 471251 ||  || — || October 21, 2006 || Kitt Peak || Spacewatch || — || align=right data-sort-value="0.62" | 620 m || 
|-id=252 bgcolor=#fefefe
| 471252 ||  || — || September 22, 2009 || Kitt Peak || Spacewatch || — || align=right data-sort-value="0.77" | 770 m || 
|-id=253 bgcolor=#fefefe
| 471253 ||  || — || April 1, 2008 || Kitt Peak || Spacewatch || — || align=right data-sort-value="0.62" | 620 m || 
|-id=254 bgcolor=#fefefe
| 471254 ||  || — || January 28, 2011 || Catalina || CSS || — || align=right data-sort-value="0.94" | 940 m || 
|-id=255 bgcolor=#fefefe
| 471255 ||  || — || September 17, 2009 || Mount Lemmon || Mount Lemmon Survey || — || align=right data-sort-value="0.96" | 960 m || 
|-id=256 bgcolor=#fefefe
| 471256 ||  || — || January 24, 2011 || Mount Lemmon || Mount Lemmon Survey || — || align=right data-sort-value="0.77" | 770 m || 
|-id=257 bgcolor=#fefefe
| 471257 ||  || — || January 28, 2011 || Mount Lemmon || Mount Lemmon Survey || — || align=right data-sort-value="0.96" | 960 m || 
|-id=258 bgcolor=#fefefe
| 471258 ||  || — || January 12, 2011 || Kitt Peak || Spacewatch || — || align=right data-sort-value="0.65" | 650 m || 
|-id=259 bgcolor=#fefefe
| 471259 ||  || — || January 12, 2011 || Mount Lemmon || Mount Lemmon Survey || NYS || align=right data-sort-value="0.64" | 640 m || 
|-id=260 bgcolor=#E9E9E9
| 471260 ||  || — || January 13, 2011 || Kitt Peak || Spacewatch || — || align=right | 1.2 km || 
|-id=261 bgcolor=#fefefe
| 471261 ||  || — || January 29, 2011 || Kitt Peak || Spacewatch || — || align=right data-sort-value="0.88" | 880 m || 
|-id=262 bgcolor=#fefefe
| 471262 ||  || — || January 30, 2011 || Kitt Peak || Spacewatch || MAS || align=right data-sort-value="0.62" | 620 m || 
|-id=263 bgcolor=#fefefe
| 471263 ||  || — || May 8, 2008 || Kitt Peak || Spacewatch || — || align=right data-sort-value="0.71" | 710 m || 
|-id=264 bgcolor=#E9E9E9
| 471264 ||  || — || February 25, 2011 || Mount Lemmon || Mount Lemmon Survey || — || align=right data-sort-value="0.96" | 960 m || 
|-id=265 bgcolor=#E9E9E9
| 471265 ||  || — || February 25, 2011 || Mount Lemmon || Mount Lemmon Survey || — || align=right | 1.5 km || 
|-id=266 bgcolor=#E9E9E9
| 471266 ||  || — || March 2, 2011 || Kitt Peak || Spacewatch || — || align=right | 1.1 km || 
|-id=267 bgcolor=#E9E9E9
| 471267 ||  || — || March 15, 2007 || Mount Lemmon || Mount Lemmon Survey || — || align=right | 1.2 km || 
|-id=268 bgcolor=#E9E9E9
| 471268 ||  || — || March 2, 2011 || Kitt Peak || Spacewatch || — || align=right data-sort-value="0.89" | 890 m || 
|-id=269 bgcolor=#E9E9E9
| 471269 ||  || — || June 9, 2007 || Kitt Peak || Spacewatch || — || align=right | 1.5 km || 
|-id=270 bgcolor=#E9E9E9
| 471270 ||  || — || January 10, 2002 || Cima Ekar || ADAS || — || align=right | 1.6 km || 
|-id=271 bgcolor=#E9E9E9
| 471271 ||  || — || July 4, 1995 || Kitt Peak || Spacewatch || — || align=right | 1.9 km || 
|-id=272 bgcolor=#C2E0FF
| 471272 ||  || — || March 27, 2011 || La Silla || La Silla Obs. || centaur || align=right | 72 km || 
|-id=273 bgcolor=#E9E9E9
| 471273 ||  || — || March 13, 2007 || Mount Lemmon || Mount Lemmon Survey || — || align=right data-sort-value="0.79" | 790 m || 
|-id=274 bgcolor=#fefefe
| 471274 ||  || — || March 15, 2004 || Kitt Peak || Spacewatch || — || align=right | 1.1 km || 
|-id=275 bgcolor=#E9E9E9
| 471275 ||  || — || March 27, 2011 || Kitt Peak || Spacewatch || critical || align=right | 1.4 km || 
|-id=276 bgcolor=#E9E9E9
| 471276 ||  || — || March 28, 2011 || Mount Lemmon || Mount Lemmon Survey || — || align=right | 1.5 km || 
|-id=277 bgcolor=#E9E9E9
| 471277 ||  || — || March 28, 2011 || Mount Lemmon || Mount Lemmon Survey || — || align=right | 1.5 km || 
|-id=278 bgcolor=#E9E9E9
| 471278 ||  || — || February 25, 2011 || Mount Lemmon || Mount Lemmon Survey || — || align=right | 2.0 km || 
|-id=279 bgcolor=#E9E9E9
| 471279 ||  || — || March 30, 2011 || Mount Lemmon || Mount Lemmon Survey || MAR || align=right | 1.2 km || 
|-id=280 bgcolor=#d6d6d6
| 471280 ||  || — || September 11, 2007 || Kitt Peak || Spacewatch || — || align=right | 3.0 km || 
|-id=281 bgcolor=#E9E9E9
| 471281 ||  || — || March 29, 2011 || Mount Lemmon || Mount Lemmon Survey || — || align=right | 2.3 km || 
|-id=282 bgcolor=#E9E9E9
| 471282 ||  || — || March 11, 2011 || Kitt Peak || Spacewatch || — || align=right | 1.2 km || 
|-id=283 bgcolor=#fefefe
| 471283 ||  || — || February 25, 2011 || Kitt Peak || Spacewatch || — || align=right data-sort-value="0.87" | 870 m || 
|-id=284 bgcolor=#E9E9E9
| 471284 ||  || — || March 14, 2011 || Catalina || CSS || — || align=right | 1.6 km || 
|-id=285 bgcolor=#E9E9E9
| 471285 ||  || — || May 14, 2007 || Catalina || CSS || — || align=right | 1.5 km || 
|-id=286 bgcolor=#E9E9E9
| 471286 ||  || — || March 11, 2011 || Mount Lemmon || Mount Lemmon Survey || — || align=right data-sort-value="0.80" | 800 m || 
|-id=287 bgcolor=#E9E9E9
| 471287 ||  || — || April 19, 2007 || Mount Lemmon || Mount Lemmon Survey || — || align=right data-sort-value="0.89" | 890 m || 
|-id=288 bgcolor=#C2E0FF
| 471288 ||  || — || April 2, 2011 || La Silla || La Silla Obs. || cubewano? || align=right | 382 km || 
|-id=289 bgcolor=#E9E9E9
| 471289 ||  || — || September 3, 2008 || Kitt Peak || Spacewatch || — || align=right | 1.8 km || 
|-id=290 bgcolor=#E9E9E9
| 471290 ||  || — || March 11, 2011 || Mount Lemmon || Mount Lemmon Survey || — || align=right | 1.1 km || 
|-id=291 bgcolor=#E9E9E9
| 471291 ||  || — || March 26, 2011 || Mount Lemmon || Mount Lemmon Survey || — || align=right | 1.3 km || 
|-id=292 bgcolor=#E9E9E9
| 471292 ||  || — || April 5, 2011 || Catalina || CSS || — || align=right | 2.2 km || 
|-id=293 bgcolor=#E9E9E9
| 471293 ||  || — || March 26, 2011 || Mount Lemmon || Mount Lemmon Survey || — || align=right | 1.2 km || 
|-id=294 bgcolor=#E9E9E9
| 471294 ||  || — || March 28, 2011 || Kitt Peak || Spacewatch || — || align=right | 1.7 km || 
|-id=295 bgcolor=#E9E9E9
| 471295 ||  || — || April 13, 2011 || Kitt Peak || Spacewatch || AGN || align=right | 1.3 km || 
|-id=296 bgcolor=#E9E9E9
| 471296 ||  || — || May 13, 2007 || Mount Lemmon || Mount Lemmon Survey || — || align=right | 1.3 km || 
|-id=297 bgcolor=#E9E9E9
| 471297 ||  || — || September 2, 2008 || Kitt Peak || Spacewatch || — || align=right data-sort-value="0.95" | 950 m || 
|-id=298 bgcolor=#E9E9E9
| 471298 ||  || — || March 26, 2011 || Mount Lemmon || Mount Lemmon Survey || — || align=right | 1.3 km || 
|-id=299 bgcolor=#E9E9E9
| 471299 ||  || — || April 22, 2011 || Kitt Peak || Spacewatch || — || align=right data-sort-value="0.93" | 930 m || 
|-id=300 bgcolor=#E9E9E9
| 471300 ||  || — || April 23, 2011 || Kitt Peak || Spacewatch || MAR || align=right | 1.2 km || 
|}

471301–471400 

|-bgcolor=#E9E9E9
| 471301 Robertajmolson ||  ||  || January 30, 2006 || Kitt Peak || Spacewatch || — || align=right | 1.7 km || 
|-id=302 bgcolor=#E9E9E9
| 471302 ||  || — || December 24, 2005 || Kitt Peak || Spacewatch || — || align=right | 1.3 km || 
|-id=303 bgcolor=#E9E9E9
| 471303 ||  || — || February 4, 2006 || Mount Lemmon || Mount Lemmon Survey || — || align=right | 1.1 km || 
|-id=304 bgcolor=#E9E9E9
| 471304 ||  || — || March 12, 2011 || Mount Lemmon || Mount Lemmon Survey || — || align=right | 1.1 km || 
|-id=305 bgcolor=#E9E9E9
| 471305 ||  || — || February 11, 2011 || Mount Lemmon || Mount Lemmon Survey || — || align=right | 1.1 km || 
|-id=306 bgcolor=#E9E9E9
| 471306 ||  || — || April 23, 2011 || Kitt Peak || Spacewatch || — || align=right | 1.2 km || 
|-id=307 bgcolor=#E9E9E9
| 471307 ||  || — || April 22, 2011 || Kitt Peak || Spacewatch || — || align=right | 1.9 km || 
|-id=308 bgcolor=#E9E9E9
| 471308 ||  || — || April 2, 2011 || Kitt Peak || Spacewatch || — || align=right | 1.5 km || 
|-id=309 bgcolor=#fefefe
| 471309 ||  || — || March 24, 2003 || Kitt Peak || Spacewatch || — || align=right | 1.1 km || 
|-id=310 bgcolor=#E9E9E9
| 471310 ||  || — || March 27, 2011 || Kitt Peak || Spacewatch || — || align=right | 2.0 km || 
|-id=311 bgcolor=#E9E9E9
| 471311 ||  || — || September 10, 2007 || Kitt Peak || Spacewatch || — || align=right | 2.4 km || 
|-id=312 bgcolor=#E9E9E9
| 471312 ||  || — || January 31, 2006 || Kitt Peak || Spacewatch || — || align=right | 1.3 km || 
|-id=313 bgcolor=#E9E9E9
| 471313 ||  || — || January 5, 2006 || Kitt Peak || Spacewatch || — || align=right | 1.1 km || 
|-id=314 bgcolor=#E9E9E9
| 471314 ||  || — || April 26, 2007 || Mount Lemmon || Mount Lemmon Survey || — || align=right data-sort-value="0.79" | 790 m || 
|-id=315 bgcolor=#d6d6d6
| 471315 ||  || — || May 5, 2011 || Kitt Peak || Spacewatch || — || align=right | 2.2 km || 
|-id=316 bgcolor=#E9E9E9
| 471316 ||  || — || May 3, 2011 || Mount Lemmon || Mount Lemmon Survey || — || align=right | 1.4 km || 
|-id=317 bgcolor=#E9E9E9
| 471317 ||  || — || November 1, 2008 || Mount Lemmon || Mount Lemmon Survey || — || align=right | 2.1 km || 
|-id=318 bgcolor=#C2E0FF
| 471318 ||  || — || May 3, 2011 || La Silla || La Silla Obs. || other TNO || align=right | 365 km || 
|-id=319 bgcolor=#E9E9E9
| 471319 ||  || — || February 15, 2010 || Kitt Peak || Spacewatch ||  || align=right | 2.4 km || 
|-id=320 bgcolor=#d6d6d6
| 471320 ||  || — || November 19, 2008 || Mount Lemmon || Mount Lemmon Survey || — || align=right | 2.5 km || 
|-id=321 bgcolor=#d6d6d6
| 471321 ||  || — || April 1, 2010 || WISE || WISE || — || align=right | 2.2 km || 
|-id=322 bgcolor=#E9E9E9
| 471322 ||  || — || October 27, 2008 || Mount Lemmon || Mount Lemmon Survey || — || align=right | 2.2 km || 
|-id=323 bgcolor=#FFC2E0
| 471323 ||  || — || May 26, 2011 || Siding Spring || SSS || APOPHA || align=right data-sort-value="0.46" | 460 m || 
|-id=324 bgcolor=#E9E9E9
| 471324 ||  || — || June 21, 2007 || Kitt Peak || Spacewatch || EUN || align=right | 1.0 km || 
|-id=325 bgcolor=#C2E0FF
| 471325 ||  || — || May 31, 2011 || Mount Lemmon || Mount Lemmon Survey || centaurdamocloidcritical || align=right | 142 km || 
|-id=326 bgcolor=#E9E9E9
| 471326 ||  || — || May 1, 2010 || WISE || WISE || MAR || align=right | 2.5 km || 
|-id=327 bgcolor=#E9E9E9
| 471327 ||  || — || December 18, 2009 || Mount Lemmon || Mount Lemmon Survey || EUN || align=right | 1.1 km || 
|-id=328 bgcolor=#d6d6d6
| 471328 ||  || — || April 20, 2006 || Kitt Peak || Spacewatch || — || align=right | 1.9 km || 
|-id=329 bgcolor=#E9E9E9
| 471329 ||  || — || January 18, 1998 || Kitt Peak || Spacewatch || EUN || align=right | 1.1 km || 
|-id=330 bgcolor=#E9E9E9
| 471330 ||  || — || May 22, 2011 || Mount Lemmon || Mount Lemmon Survey || — || align=right | 1.3 km || 
|-id=331 bgcolor=#E9E9E9
| 471331 ||  || — || April 24, 2011 || Kitt Peak || Spacewatch || — || align=right | 2.1 km || 
|-id=332 bgcolor=#E9E9E9
| 471332 ||  || — || April 26, 2011 || Mount Lemmon || Mount Lemmon Survey || — || align=right | 2.7 km || 
|-id=333 bgcolor=#E9E9E9
| 471333 ||  || — || September 13, 1998 || Kitt Peak || Spacewatch || AEO || align=right data-sort-value="0.99" | 990 m || 
|-id=334 bgcolor=#fefefe
| 471334 ||  || — || June 12, 2011 || Mount Lemmon || Mount Lemmon Survey || H || align=right data-sort-value="0.64" | 640 m || 
|-id=335 bgcolor=#C7FF8F
| 471335 ||  || — || July 25, 2011 || Haleakala || Pan-STARRS || centaur || align=right | 74 km || 
|-id=336 bgcolor=#fefefe
| 471336 ||  || — || December 15, 1999 || Kitt Peak || Spacewatch || H || align=right data-sort-value="0.62" | 620 m || 
|-id=337 bgcolor=#d6d6d6
| 471337 ||  || — || April 1, 2005 || Kitt Peak || Spacewatch || — || align=right | 2.3 km || 
|-id=338 bgcolor=#E9E9E9
| 471338 ||  || — || June 4, 2011 || Mount Lemmon || Mount Lemmon Survey || — || align=right | 2.7 km || 
|-id=339 bgcolor=#C7FF8F
| 471339 ||  || — || July 27, 2011 || Haleakala || Pan-STARRS || centaur || align=right | 24 km || 
|-id=340 bgcolor=#d6d6d6
| 471340 ||  || — || January 3, 2009 || Kitt Peak || Spacewatch || — || align=right | 2.4 km || 
|-id=341 bgcolor=#d6d6d6
| 471341 ||  || — || October 4, 2006 || Mount Lemmon || Mount Lemmon Survey || — || align=right | 2.8 km || 
|-id=342 bgcolor=#d6d6d6
| 471342 ||  || — || September 23, 2006 || Kitt Peak || Spacewatch || EOS || align=right | 1.5 km || 
|-id=343 bgcolor=#d6d6d6
| 471343 ||  || — || August 21, 2006 || Kitt Peak || Spacewatch || EOS || align=right | 1.4 km || 
|-id=344 bgcolor=#d6d6d6
| 471344 ||  || — || March 31, 2004 || Kitt Peak || Spacewatch || — || align=right | 2.9 km || 
|-id=345 bgcolor=#d6d6d6
| 471345 ||  || — || September 25, 2006 || Kitt Peak || Spacewatch || — || align=right | 2.4 km || 
|-id=346 bgcolor=#d6d6d6
| 471346 ||  || — || June 24, 2010 || WISE || WISE || — || align=right | 2.9 km || 
|-id=347 bgcolor=#fefefe
| 471347 ||  || — || June 9, 2011 || Mount Lemmon || Mount Lemmon Survey || H || align=right data-sort-value="0.87" | 870 m || 
|-id=348 bgcolor=#d6d6d6
| 471348 ||  || — || September 19, 2006 || Catalina || CSS || — || align=right | 2.4 km || 
|-id=349 bgcolor=#d6d6d6
| 471349 ||  || — || August 29, 2011 || Siding Spring || SSS || — || align=right | 3.7 km || 
|-id=350 bgcolor=#d6d6d6
| 471350 ||  || — || September 14, 2005 || Kitt Peak || Spacewatch || 7:4 || align=right | 2.5 km || 
|-id=351 bgcolor=#d6d6d6
| 471351 ||  || — || October 16, 2006 || Catalina || CSS || critical || align=right | 2.0 km || 
|-id=352 bgcolor=#d6d6d6
| 471352 ||  || — || September 16, 2006 || Catalina || CSS || — || align=right | 2.4 km || 
|-id=353 bgcolor=#fefefe
| 471353 ||  || — || June 12, 2011 || Mount Lemmon || Mount Lemmon Survey || H || align=right data-sort-value="0.68" | 680 m || 
|-id=354 bgcolor=#d6d6d6
| 471354 ||  || — || February 8, 2008 || Kitt Peak || Spacewatch || — || align=right | 2.5 km || 
|-id=355 bgcolor=#d6d6d6
| 471355 ||  || — || August 26, 2011 || Kitt Peak || Spacewatch || — || align=right | 2.5 km || 
|-id=356 bgcolor=#d6d6d6
| 471356 ||  || — || October 23, 1995 || Kitt Peak || Spacewatch || — || align=right | 1.8 km || 
|-id=357 bgcolor=#d6d6d6
| 471357 ||  || — || December 18, 2007 || Mount Lemmon || Mount Lemmon Survey || EOS || align=right | 1.6 km || 
|-id=358 bgcolor=#d6d6d6
| 471358 ||  || — || September 7, 2000 || Kitt Peak || Spacewatch || — || align=right | 3.3 km || 
|-id=359 bgcolor=#d6d6d6
| 471359 ||  || — || September 4, 2011 || Kitt Peak || Spacewatch || — || align=right | 2.5 km || 
|-id=360 bgcolor=#d6d6d6
| 471360 ||  || — || August 31, 2000 || Socorro || LINEAR || — || align=right | 2.9 km || 
|-id=361 bgcolor=#d6d6d6
| 471361 ||  || — || November 2, 2006 || Mount Lemmon || Mount Lemmon Survey || — || align=right | 2.6 km || 
|-id=362 bgcolor=#d6d6d6
| 471362 ||  || — || October 19, 2006 || Mount Lemmon || Mount Lemmon Survey || — || align=right | 2.6 km || 
|-id=363 bgcolor=#d6d6d6
| 471363 ||  || — || January 14, 2008 || Kitt Peak || Spacewatch || — || align=right | 3.1 km || 
|-id=364 bgcolor=#d6d6d6
| 471364 ||  || — || February 17, 2010 || WISE || WISE || — || align=right | 3.1 km || 
|-id=365 bgcolor=#d6d6d6
| 471365 ||  || — || December 20, 2007 || Mount Lemmon || Mount Lemmon Survey ||  || align=right | 2.6 km || 
|-id=366 bgcolor=#d6d6d6
| 471366 ||  || — || March 11, 2008 || Mount Lemmon || Mount Lemmon Survey || — || align=right | 2.9 km || 
|-id=367 bgcolor=#d6d6d6
| 471367 ||  || — || January 11, 2008 || Kitt Peak || Spacewatch || — || align=right | 3.2 km || 
|-id=368 bgcolor=#d6d6d6
| 471368 ||  || — || October 4, 2006 || Mount Lemmon || Mount Lemmon Survey || — || align=right | 4.1 km || 
|-id=369 bgcolor=#d6d6d6
| 471369 ||  || — || January 10, 2008 || Kitt Peak || Spacewatch || — || align=right | 2.4 km || 
|-id=370 bgcolor=#fefefe
| 471370 ||  || — || October 16, 2006 || Catalina || CSS || H || align=right data-sort-value="0.64" | 640 m || 
|-id=371 bgcolor=#d6d6d6
| 471371 ||  || — || September 4, 2000 || Kitt Peak || Spacewatch || — || align=right | 2.1 km || 
|-id=372 bgcolor=#d6d6d6
| 471372 ||  || — || January 11, 2008 || Catalina || CSS || — || align=right | 3.3 km || 
|-id=373 bgcolor=#d6d6d6
| 471373 ||  || — || August 31, 2005 || Kitt Peak || Spacewatch || — || align=right | 3.1 km || 
|-id=374 bgcolor=#d6d6d6
| 471374 ||  || — || April 12, 2010 || WISE || WISE || — || align=right | 4.0 km || 
|-id=375 bgcolor=#d6d6d6
| 471375 ||  || — || September 22, 2011 || Kitt Peak || Spacewatch || — || align=right | 2.8 km || 
|-id=376 bgcolor=#d6d6d6
| 471376 ||  || — || September 22, 2011 || Kitt Peak || Spacewatch || — || align=right | 2.7 km || 
|-id=377 bgcolor=#d6d6d6
| 471377 ||  || — || April 8, 2010 || WISE || WISE || — || align=right | 4.7 km || 
|-id=378 bgcolor=#d6d6d6
| 471378 ||  || — || September 26, 1995 || Kitt Peak || Spacewatch || — || align=right | 2.8 km || 
|-id=379 bgcolor=#d6d6d6
| 471379 ||  || — || September 23, 2011 || Kitt Peak || Spacewatch || — || align=right | 2.5 km || 
|-id=380 bgcolor=#d6d6d6
| 471380 ||  || — || February 9, 2010 || WISE || WISE || LIX || align=right | 3.5 km || 
|-id=381 bgcolor=#d6d6d6
| 471381 ||  || — || October 28, 2006 || Catalina || CSS || — || align=right | 3.1 km || 
|-id=382 bgcolor=#d6d6d6
| 471382 ||  || — || December 3, 2007 || Kitt Peak || Spacewatch || KOR || align=right | 1.2 km || 
|-id=383 bgcolor=#d6d6d6
| 471383 ||  || — || September 18, 2011 || Mount Lemmon || Mount Lemmon Survey || — || align=right | 2.6 km || 
|-id=384 bgcolor=#d6d6d6
| 471384 ||  || — || June 28, 2011 || Mount Lemmon || Mount Lemmon Survey || LIX || align=right | 3.2 km || 
|-id=385 bgcolor=#d6d6d6
| 471385 ||  || — || November 25, 2006 || Kitt Peak || Spacewatch || THM || align=right | 2.3 km || 
|-id=386 bgcolor=#d6d6d6
| 471386 ||  || — || August 30, 2005 || Kitt Peak || Spacewatch || THM || align=right | 2.2 km || 
|-id=387 bgcolor=#d6d6d6
| 471387 ||  || — || September 20, 2011 || Kitt Peak || Spacewatch || — || align=right | 2.9 km || 
|-id=388 bgcolor=#d6d6d6
| 471388 ||  || — || February 28, 2008 || Mount Lemmon || Mount Lemmon Survey || THM || align=right | 2.5 km || 
|-id=389 bgcolor=#d6d6d6
| 471389 ||  || — || September 23, 2011 || Kitt Peak || Spacewatch || (159) || align=right | 2.5 km || 
|-id=390 bgcolor=#d6d6d6
| 471390 ||  || — || October 6, 2005 || Mount Lemmon || Mount Lemmon Survey || — || align=right | 2.5 km || 
|-id=391 bgcolor=#d6d6d6
| 471391 ||  || — || March 31, 2008 || Kitt Peak || Spacewatch || — || align=right | 4.4 km || 
|-id=392 bgcolor=#d6d6d6
| 471392 ||  || — || September 23, 2011 || Kitt Peak || Spacewatch || LIX || align=right | 3.5 km || 
|-id=393 bgcolor=#d6d6d6
| 471393 ||  || — || October 12, 2006 || Kitt Peak || Spacewatch || — || align=right | 2.4 km || 
|-id=394 bgcolor=#d6d6d6
| 471394 ||  || — || February 23, 2003 || Kitt Peak || Spacewatch || EOS || align=right | 2.3 km || 
|-id=395 bgcolor=#d6d6d6
| 471395 ||  || — || September 27, 2006 || Mount Lemmon || Mount Lemmon Survey || — || align=right | 2.5 km || 
|-id=396 bgcolor=#d6d6d6
| 471396 ||  || — || September 21, 2011 || Catalina || CSS || — || align=right | 2.6 km || 
|-id=397 bgcolor=#d6d6d6
| 471397 ||  || — || September 21, 2011 || Catalina || CSS || — || align=right | 3.4 km || 
|-id=398 bgcolor=#d6d6d6
| 471398 ||  || — || February 9, 2003 || Kitt Peak || Spacewatch || — || align=right | 3.8 km || 
|-id=399 bgcolor=#d6d6d6
| 471399 ||  || — || September 26, 2011 || Mount Lemmon || Mount Lemmon Survey || — || align=right | 2.7 km || 
|-id=400 bgcolor=#d6d6d6
| 471400 ||  || — || November 25, 2006 || Mount Lemmon || Mount Lemmon Survey || — || align=right | 3.1 km || 
|}

471401–471500 

|-bgcolor=#d6d6d6
| 471401 ||  || — || September 30, 2005 || Mount Lemmon || Mount Lemmon Survey || EOS || align=right | 2.2 km || 
|-id=402 bgcolor=#d6d6d6
| 471402 ||  || — || September 28, 2011 || Mount Lemmon || Mount Lemmon Survey || — || align=right | 2.2 km || 
|-id=403 bgcolor=#d6d6d6
| 471403 ||  || — || September 22, 2011 || Kitt Peak || Spacewatch || — || align=right | 2.9 km || 
|-id=404 bgcolor=#d6d6d6
| 471404 ||  || — || October 26, 2000 || Kitt Peak || Spacewatch || — || align=right | 2.5 km || 
|-id=405 bgcolor=#d6d6d6
| 471405 ||  || — || December 17, 2007 || Kitt Peak || Spacewatch || — || align=right | 3.0 km || 
|-id=406 bgcolor=#fefefe
| 471406 ||  || — || October 22, 2003 || Kitt Peak || Spacewatch || H || align=right data-sort-value="0.60" | 600 m || 
|-id=407 bgcolor=#d6d6d6
| 471407 ||  || — || October 20, 2006 || Kitt Peak || Spacewatch || — || align=right | 2.5 km || 
|-id=408 bgcolor=#d6d6d6
| 471408 ||  || — || September 23, 2011 || Kitt Peak || Spacewatch || — || align=right | 3.3 km || 
|-id=409 bgcolor=#d6d6d6
| 471409 ||  || — || November 11, 2006 || Mount Lemmon || Mount Lemmon Survey || THM || align=right | 2.0 km || 
|-id=410 bgcolor=#E9E9E9
| 471410 ||  || — || November 5, 2007 || Kitt Peak || Spacewatch || — || align=right | 1.5 km || 
|-id=411 bgcolor=#d6d6d6
| 471411 ||  || — || April 17, 2010 || WISE || WISE || — || align=right | 3.4 km || 
|-id=412 bgcolor=#d6d6d6
| 471412 ||  || — || August 3, 2010 || WISE || WISE || — || align=right | 2.8 km || 
|-id=413 bgcolor=#d6d6d6
| 471413 ||  || — || February 3, 2008 || Kitt Peak || Spacewatch || — || align=right | 3.5 km || 
|-id=414 bgcolor=#d6d6d6
| 471414 ||  || — || February 19, 2009 || Kitt Peak || Spacewatch || — || align=right | 3.3 km || 
|-id=415 bgcolor=#d6d6d6
| 471415 ||  || — || January 17, 2008 || Mount Lemmon || Mount Lemmon Survey || — || align=right | 2.8 km || 
|-id=416 bgcolor=#d6d6d6
| 471416 ||  || — || October 22, 2006 || Kitt Peak || Spacewatch || (159) || align=right | 2.9 km || 
|-id=417 bgcolor=#d6d6d6
| 471417 ||  || — || February 2, 2008 || Mount Lemmon || Mount Lemmon Survey || — || align=right | 2.8 km || 
|-id=418 bgcolor=#d6d6d6
| 471418 ||  || — || December 3, 2007 || Kitt Peak || Spacewatch || — || align=right | 2.3 km || 
|-id=419 bgcolor=#d6d6d6
| 471419 ||  || — || April 11, 2003 || Kitt Peak || Spacewatch || — || align=right | 4.8 km || 
|-id=420 bgcolor=#d6d6d6
| 471420 ||  || — || October 18, 2011 || Mount Lemmon || Mount Lemmon Survey || — || align=right | 2.6 km || 
|-id=421 bgcolor=#d6d6d6
| 471421 ||  || — || October 18, 2011 || Mount Lemmon || Mount Lemmon Survey || — || align=right | 2.8 km || 
|-id=422 bgcolor=#d6d6d6
| 471422 ||  || — || August 8, 1999 || Kitt Peak || Spacewatch || THM || align=right | 2.0 km || 
|-id=423 bgcolor=#d6d6d6
| 471423 ||  || — || March 1, 2008 || Kitt Peak || Spacewatch || — || align=right | 3.3 km || 
|-id=424 bgcolor=#d6d6d6
| 471424 ||  || — || February 11, 2008 || Mount Lemmon || Mount Lemmon Survey || — || align=right | 3.8 km || 
|-id=425 bgcolor=#d6d6d6
| 471425 ||  || — || October 16, 2011 || Kitt Peak || Spacewatch || — || align=right | 3.6 km || 
|-id=426 bgcolor=#d6d6d6
| 471426 ||  || — || September 12, 2005 || Kitt Peak || Spacewatch || — || align=right | 1.9 km || 
|-id=427 bgcolor=#d6d6d6
| 471427 ||  || — || October 2, 1995 || Kitt Peak || Spacewatch || — || align=right | 2.0 km || 
|-id=428 bgcolor=#d6d6d6
| 471428 ||  || — || February 14, 2008 || Mount Lemmon || Mount Lemmon Survey || — || align=right | 2.9 km || 
|-id=429 bgcolor=#d6d6d6
| 471429 ||  || — || September 22, 2000 || Socorro || LINEAR || — || align=right | 3.1 km || 
|-id=430 bgcolor=#FA8072
| 471430 ||  || — || October 22, 2011 || Catalina || CSS || H || align=right data-sort-value="0.71" | 710 m || 
|-id=431 bgcolor=#fefefe
| 471431 ||  || — || October 16, 2003 || Kitt Peak || Spacewatch || H || align=right data-sort-value="0.61" | 610 m || 
|-id=432 bgcolor=#d6d6d6
| 471432 ||  || — || November 10, 2006 || Kitt Peak || Spacewatch || — || align=right | 4.9 km || 
|-id=433 bgcolor=#d6d6d6
| 471433 ||  || — || May 25, 2010 || WISE || WISE || — || align=right | 3.5 km || 
|-id=434 bgcolor=#d6d6d6
| 471434 ||  || — || November 16, 2006 || Kitt Peak || Spacewatch || EOS || align=right | 3.4 km || 
|-id=435 bgcolor=#d6d6d6
| 471435 ||  || — || October 18, 2011 || Mount Lemmon || Mount Lemmon Survey || URS || align=right | 2.8 km || 
|-id=436 bgcolor=#fefefe
| 471436 ||  || — || October 1, 2011 || Kitt Peak || Spacewatch || H || align=right data-sort-value="0.75" | 750 m || 
|-id=437 bgcolor=#fefefe
| 471437 ||  || — || February 18, 2010 || Mount Lemmon || Mount Lemmon Survey || H || align=right data-sort-value="0.72" | 720 m || 
|-id=438 bgcolor=#d6d6d6
| 471438 ||  || — || March 31, 2010 || WISE || WISE || Tj (2.99) || align=right | 5.3 km || 
|-id=439 bgcolor=#d6d6d6
| 471439 ||  || — || February 24, 2008 || Mount Lemmon || Mount Lemmon Survey || EOS || align=right | 2.2 km || 
|-id=440 bgcolor=#d6d6d6
| 471440 ||  || — || November 27, 2006 || Kitt Peak || Spacewatch || — || align=right | 3.3 km || 
|-id=441 bgcolor=#d6d6d6
| 471441 ||  || — || November 16, 2006 || Kitt Peak || Spacewatch || — || align=right | 2.1 km || 
|-id=442 bgcolor=#d6d6d6
| 471442 ||  || — || October 1, 2011 || Kitt Peak || Spacewatch || — || align=right | 2.9 km || 
|-id=443 bgcolor=#d6d6d6
| 471443 ||  || — || October 1, 2011 || Kitt Peak || Spacewatch || — || align=right | 2.9 km || 
|-id=444 bgcolor=#d6d6d6
| 471444 ||  || — || March 26, 2010 || WISE || WISE || — || align=right | 3.7 km || 
|-id=445 bgcolor=#d6d6d6
| 471445 ||  || — || September 24, 2011 || Mount Lemmon || Mount Lemmon Survey || — || align=right | 3.0 km || 
|-id=446 bgcolor=#d6d6d6
| 471446 ||  || — || February 28, 2008 || Kitt Peak || Spacewatch || — || align=right | 2.5 km || 
|-id=447 bgcolor=#d6d6d6
| 471447 ||  || — || October 25, 2005 || Kitt Peak || Spacewatch || — || align=right | 4.9 km || 
|-id=448 bgcolor=#fefefe
| 471448 ||  || — || October 24, 2011 || Kitt Peak || Spacewatch || H || align=right data-sort-value="0.80" | 800 m || 
|-id=449 bgcolor=#d6d6d6
| 471449 ||  || — || July 31, 2005 || Socorro || LINEAR || Tj (2.99) || align=right | 4.8 km || 
|-id=450 bgcolor=#fefefe
| 471450 ||  || — || October 21, 2011 || Catalina || CSS || H || align=right data-sort-value="0.81" | 810 m || 
|-id=451 bgcolor=#fefefe
| 471451 ||  || — || April 26, 2010 || Mount Lemmon || Mount Lemmon Survey || H || align=right data-sort-value="0.51" | 510 m || 
|-id=452 bgcolor=#d6d6d6
| 471452 ||  || — || May 13, 2010 || WISE || WISE || — || align=right | 3.6 km || 
|-id=453 bgcolor=#d6d6d6
| 471453 ||  || — || October 21, 2006 || Mount Lemmon || Mount Lemmon Survey || — || align=right | 1.7 km || 
|-id=454 bgcolor=#d6d6d6
| 471454 ||  || — || March 1, 2008 || Kitt Peak || Spacewatch || — || align=right | 2.7 km || 
|-id=455 bgcolor=#d6d6d6
| 471455 ||  || — || October 23, 2006 || Mount Lemmon || Mount Lemmon Survey || — || align=right | 3.2 km || 
|-id=456 bgcolor=#d6d6d6
| 471456 ||  || — || October 20, 2011 || Catalina || CSS || — || align=right | 2.4 km || 
|-id=457 bgcolor=#d6d6d6
| 471457 ||  || — || March 12, 2008 || Mount Lemmon || Mount Lemmon Survey || — || align=right | 3.2 km || 
|-id=458 bgcolor=#d6d6d6
| 471458 ||  || — || February 7, 2002 || Palomar || NEAT || EOS || align=right | 2.3 km || 
|-id=459 bgcolor=#d6d6d6
| 471459 ||  || — || April 8, 2008 || Mount Lemmon || Mount Lemmon Survey || 7:4 || align=right | 3.4 km || 
|-id=460 bgcolor=#d6d6d6
| 471460 ||  || — || April 19, 2010 || WISE || WISE || THB || align=right | 3.3 km || 
|-id=461 bgcolor=#d6d6d6
| 471461 ||  || — || October 1, 2011 || Kitt Peak || Spacewatch || — || align=right | 3.4 km || 
|-id=462 bgcolor=#d6d6d6
| 471462 ||  || — || October 23, 2011 || Kitt Peak || Spacewatch || TIR || align=right | 2.5 km || 
|-id=463 bgcolor=#d6d6d6
| 471463 ||  || — || September 23, 2005 || Kitt Peak || Spacewatch || — || align=right | 2.8 km || 
|-id=464 bgcolor=#d6d6d6
| 471464 ||  || — || January 10, 2008 || Mount Lemmon || Mount Lemmon Survey || — || align=right | 3.1 km || 
|-id=465 bgcolor=#d6d6d6
| 471465 ||  || — || October 12, 2005 || Kitt Peak || Spacewatch || — || align=right | 2.7 km || 
|-id=466 bgcolor=#d6d6d6
| 471466 ||  || — || September 28, 2011 || Kitt Peak || Spacewatch || EOS || align=right | 1.6 km || 
|-id=467 bgcolor=#d6d6d6
| 471467 ||  || — || December 1, 2006 || Mount Lemmon || Mount Lemmon Survey || — || align=right | 2.6 km || 
|-id=468 bgcolor=#d6d6d6
| 471468 ||  || — || September 20, 2011 || Mount Lemmon || Mount Lemmon Survey || — || align=right | 2.5 km || 
|-id=469 bgcolor=#d6d6d6
| 471469 ||  || — || October 20, 2006 || Mount Lemmon || Mount Lemmon Survey || — || align=right | 2.6 km || 
|-id=470 bgcolor=#d6d6d6
| 471470 ||  || — || May 7, 2010 || WISE || WISE || VER || align=right | 3.2 km || 
|-id=471 bgcolor=#d6d6d6
| 471471 ||  || — || October 22, 1995 || Kitt Peak || Spacewatch || — || align=right | 2.3 km || 
|-id=472 bgcolor=#fefefe
| 471472 ||  || — || May 8, 2005 || Kitt Peak || Spacewatch || H || align=right data-sort-value="0.81" | 810 m || 
|-id=473 bgcolor=#d6d6d6
| 471473 ||  || — || September 8, 2011 || Kitt Peak || Spacewatch || — || align=right | 2.4 km || 
|-id=474 bgcolor=#d6d6d6
| 471474 ||  || — || February 9, 2008 || Mount Lemmon || Mount Lemmon Survey || VER || align=right | 2.2 km || 
|-id=475 bgcolor=#d6d6d6
| 471475 ||  || — || December 19, 2007 || Mount Lemmon || Mount Lemmon Survey || — || align=right | 3.4 km || 
|-id=476 bgcolor=#d6d6d6
| 471476 ||  || — || October 1, 2005 || Mount Lemmon || Mount Lemmon Survey || — || align=right | 3.0 km || 
|-id=477 bgcolor=#d6d6d6
| 471477 ||  || — || June 29, 2005 || Kitt Peak || Spacewatch || — || align=right | 2.7 km || 
|-id=478 bgcolor=#d6d6d6
| 471478 ||  || — || October 20, 2011 || Mount Lemmon || Mount Lemmon Survey || — || align=right | 2.6 km || 
|-id=479 bgcolor=#d6d6d6
| 471479 ||  || — || September 26, 2005 || Catalina || CSS || — || align=right | 3.1 km || 
|-id=480 bgcolor=#d6d6d6
| 471480 ||  || — || September 14, 2010 || Mount Lemmon || Mount Lemmon Survey || VER || align=right | 2.8 km || 
|-id=481 bgcolor=#d6d6d6
| 471481 ||  || — || June 15, 2005 || Mount Lemmon || Mount Lemmon Survey || — || align=right | 2.1 km || 
|-id=482 bgcolor=#d6d6d6
| 471482 ||  || — || November 20, 2000 || Anderson Mesa || LONEOS || — || align=right | 3.3 km || 
|-id=483 bgcolor=#d6d6d6
| 471483 ||  || — || April 20, 2010 || WISE || WISE || — || align=right | 4.3 km || 
|-id=484 bgcolor=#d6d6d6
| 471484 ||  || — || September 23, 2011 || Kitt Peak || Spacewatch || — || align=right | 2.5 km || 
|-id=485 bgcolor=#d6d6d6
| 471485 ||  || — || November 22, 2006 || Mount Lemmon || Mount Lemmon Survey || — || align=right | 3.4 km || 
|-id=486 bgcolor=#d6d6d6
| 471486 ||  || — || January 18, 2008 || Kitt Peak || Spacewatch || — || align=right | 3.9 km || 
|-id=487 bgcolor=#FFC2E0
| 471487 ||  || — || November 3, 2011 || Socorro || LINEAR || APO || align=right data-sort-value="0.43" | 430 m || 
|-id=488 bgcolor=#fefefe
| 471488 ||  || — || November 19, 2003 || Socorro || LINEAR || H || align=right data-sort-value="0.65" | 650 m || 
|-id=489 bgcolor=#d6d6d6
| 471489 ||  || — || September 26, 2000 || Socorro || LINEAR || — || align=right | 4.1 km || 
|-id=490 bgcolor=#d6d6d6
| 471490 ||  || — || September 1, 2005 || Kitt Peak || Spacewatch || — || align=right | 2.5 km || 
|-id=491 bgcolor=#d6d6d6
| 471491 ||  || — || September 25, 2006 || Kitt Peak || Spacewatch || — || align=right | 3.6 km || 
|-id=492 bgcolor=#d6d6d6
| 471492 ||  || — || May 16, 2010 || WISE || WISE || — || align=right | 3.9 km || 
|-id=493 bgcolor=#d6d6d6
| 471493 ||  || — || September 27, 2000 || Socorro || LINEAR || — || align=right | 3.5 km || 
|-id=494 bgcolor=#d6d6d6
| 471494 ||  || — || September 24, 2006 || Kitt Peak || Spacewatch || — || align=right | 4.1 km || 
|-id=495 bgcolor=#E9E9E9
| 471495 ||  || — || April 20, 2009 || Kitt Peak || Spacewatch || — || align=right | 1.9 km || 
|-id=496 bgcolor=#d6d6d6
| 471496 ||  || — || December 4, 2005 || Kitt Peak || Spacewatch || 7:4 || align=right | 5.4 km || 
|-id=497 bgcolor=#d6d6d6
| 471497 ||  || — || October 27, 2011 || Mount Lemmon || Mount Lemmon Survey || LIXcritical || align=right | 2.8 km || 
|-id=498 bgcolor=#d6d6d6
| 471498 ||  || — || April 25, 2010 || WISE || WISE || — || align=right | 4.2 km || 
|-id=499 bgcolor=#d6d6d6
| 471499 ||  || — || September 6, 2005 || Anderson Mesa || LONEOS || LIX || align=right | 3.4 km || 
|-id=500 bgcolor=#fefefe
| 471500 ||  || — || September 24, 2008 || Catalina || CSS || H || align=right data-sort-value="0.75" | 750 m || 
|}

471501–471600 

|-bgcolor=#FA8072
| 471501 ||  || — || December 5, 2003 || Socorro || LINEAR || H || align=right | 1.0 km || 
|-id=502 bgcolor=#d6d6d6
| 471502 ||  || — || February 18, 2004 || Kitt Peak || Spacewatch || Tj (2.93) || align=right | 5.4 km || 
|-id=503 bgcolor=#C2FFFF
| 471503 ||  || — || January 28, 2010 || WISE || WISE || L4 || align=right | 9.1 km || 
|-id=504 bgcolor=#d6d6d6
| 471504 ||  || — || October 13, 2010 || Mount Lemmon || Mount Lemmon Survey || — || align=right | 2.8 km || 
|-id=505 bgcolor=#fefefe
| 471505 ||  || — || September 30, 2005 || Catalina || CSS || H || align=right data-sort-value="0.75" | 750 m || 
|-id=506 bgcolor=#fefefe
| 471506 ||  || — || January 17, 2012 || Socorro || LINEAR || — || align=right data-sort-value="0.93" | 930 m || 
|-id=507 bgcolor=#fefefe
| 471507 ||  || — || January 19, 2012 || Kitt Peak || Spacewatch || H || align=right data-sort-value="0.73" | 730 m || 
|-id=508 bgcolor=#fefefe
| 471508 ||  || — || March 3, 2005 || Kitt Peak || Spacewatch || — || align=right data-sort-value="0.56" | 560 m || 
|-id=509 bgcolor=#fefefe
| 471509 ||  || — || January 2, 2012 || Kitt Peak || Spacewatch || H || align=right data-sort-value="0.73" | 730 m || 
|-id=510 bgcolor=#E9E9E9
| 471510 ||  || — || March 26, 2008 || Mount Lemmon || Mount Lemmon Survey || — || align=right | 2.1 km || 
|-id=511 bgcolor=#fefefe
| 471511 ||  || — || December 29, 2008 || Mount Lemmon || Mount Lemmon Survey || H || align=right data-sort-value="0.56" | 560 m || 
|-id=512 bgcolor=#C7FF8F
| 471512 ||  || — || February 1, 2012 || Mount Lemmon || Mount Lemmon Survey || centaur || align=right | 75 km || 
|-id=513 bgcolor=#C7FF8F
| 471513 ||  || — || February 3, 2012 || Haleakala || Pan-STARRS || centaur || align=right | 70 km || 
|-id=514 bgcolor=#fefefe
| 471514 ||  || — || February 21, 2012 || Kitt Peak || Spacewatch || — || align=right data-sort-value="0.67" | 670 m || 
|-id=515 bgcolor=#fefefe
| 471515 ||  || — || October 2, 2010 || Kitt Peak || Spacewatch || — || align=right data-sort-value="0.68" | 680 m || 
|-id=516 bgcolor=#fefefe
| 471516 ||  || — || March 23, 2006 || Mount Lemmon || Mount Lemmon Survey || critical || align=right data-sort-value="0.59" | 590 m || 
|-id=517 bgcolor=#fefefe
| 471517 ||  || — || March 10, 2002 || Cima Ekar || ADAS || — || align=right data-sort-value="0.62" | 620 m || 
|-id=518 bgcolor=#E9E9E9
| 471518 ||  || — || January 9, 2008 || Mount Lemmon || Mount Lemmon Survey || EUN || align=right | 1.1 km || 
|-id=519 bgcolor=#fefefe
| 471519 ||  || — || March 16, 2012 || Kitt Peak || Spacewatch || MAS || align=right data-sort-value="0.56" | 560 m || 
|-id=520 bgcolor=#fefefe
| 471520 ||  || — || October 19, 2006 || Kitt Peak || Spacewatch || — || align=right data-sort-value="0.55" | 550 m || 
|-id=521 bgcolor=#fefefe
| 471521 ||  || — || September 15, 2009 || Kitt Peak || Spacewatch || — || align=right | 1.0 km || 
|-id=522 bgcolor=#fefefe
| 471522 ||  || — || May 10, 2005 || Kitt Peak || Spacewatch || — || align=right data-sort-value="0.71" | 710 m || 
|-id=523 bgcolor=#fefefe
| 471523 ||  || — || October 19, 2003 || Kitt Peak || Spacewatch || — || align=right data-sort-value="0.78" | 780 m || 
|-id=524 bgcolor=#fefefe
| 471524 ||  || — || March 12, 2005 || Kitt Peak || Spacewatch || — || align=right data-sort-value="0.52" | 520 m || 
|-id=525 bgcolor=#fefefe
| 471525 ||  || — || March 11, 2005 || Mount Lemmon || Mount Lemmon Survey || — || align=right data-sort-value="0.62" | 620 m || 
|-id=526 bgcolor=#fefefe
| 471526 ||  || — || December 31, 2007 || Kitt Peak || Spacewatch || — || align=right data-sort-value="0.75" | 750 m || 
|-id=527 bgcolor=#fefefe
| 471527 ||  || — || February 2, 2008 || Kitt Peak || Spacewatch || — || align=right data-sort-value="0.73" | 730 m || 
|-id=528 bgcolor=#fefefe
| 471528 ||  || — || December 19, 2007 || Mount Lemmon || Mount Lemmon Survey || — || align=right data-sort-value="0.82" | 820 m || 
|-id=529 bgcolor=#fefefe
| 471529 ||  || — || February 13, 2008 || Mount Lemmon || Mount Lemmon Survey || — || align=right | 2.0 km || 
|-id=530 bgcolor=#fefefe
| 471530 ||  || — || March 1, 2012 || Mount Lemmon || Mount Lemmon Survey || — || align=right | 1.0 km || 
|-id=531 bgcolor=#fefefe
| 471531 ||  || — || March 28, 2012 || Kitt Peak || Spacewatch || — || align=right data-sort-value="0.71" | 710 m || 
|-id=532 bgcolor=#fefefe
| 471532 ||  || — || March 19, 2001 || Anderson Mesa || LONEOS || — || align=right data-sort-value="0.73" | 730 m || 
|-id=533 bgcolor=#fefefe
| 471533 ||  || — || March 15, 2008 || Mount Lemmon || Mount Lemmon Survey || — || align=right data-sort-value="0.82" | 820 m || 
|-id=534 bgcolor=#fefefe
| 471534 ||  || — || April 20, 2012 || Kitt Peak || Spacewatch || — || align=right data-sort-value="0.69" | 690 m || 
|-id=535 bgcolor=#fefefe
| 471535 ||  || — || January 10, 2008 || Mount Lemmon || Mount Lemmon Survey || — || align=right data-sort-value="0.76" | 760 m || 
|-id=536 bgcolor=#fefefe
| 471536 ||  || — || April 28, 2012 || Mount Lemmon || Mount Lemmon Survey || NYS || align=right data-sort-value="0.54" | 540 m || 
|-id=537 bgcolor=#fefefe
| 471537 ||  || — || April 29, 2012 || Mount Lemmon || Mount Lemmon Survey || V || align=right data-sort-value="0.52" | 520 m || 
|-id=538 bgcolor=#fefefe
| 471538 ||  || — || December 4, 2007 || Mount Lemmon || Mount Lemmon Survey || — || align=right data-sort-value="0.80" | 800 m || 
|-id=539 bgcolor=#fefefe
| 471539 ||  || — || April 16, 2012 || Kitt Peak || Spacewatch || — || align=right data-sort-value="0.86" | 860 m || 
|-id=540 bgcolor=#fefefe
| 471540 ||  || — || August 16, 2009 || Catalina || CSS || — || align=right data-sort-value="0.79" | 790 m || 
|-id=541 bgcolor=#fefefe
| 471541 ||  || — || October 3, 2006 || Mount Lemmon || Mount Lemmon Survey || — || align=right data-sort-value="0.93" | 930 m || 
|-id=542 bgcolor=#fefefe
| 471542 ||  || — || December 6, 2010 || Mount Lemmon || Mount Lemmon Survey || — || align=right data-sort-value="0.61" | 610 m || 
|-id=543 bgcolor=#fefefe
| 471543 ||  || — || October 2, 2006 || Mount Lemmon || Mount Lemmon Survey || — || align=right data-sort-value="0.50" | 500 m || 
|-id=544 bgcolor=#fefefe
| 471544 ||  || — || April 8, 2008 || Kitt Peak || Spacewatch || — || align=right data-sort-value="0.77" | 770 m || 
|-id=545 bgcolor=#FA8072
| 471545 ||  || — || June 11, 2005 || Catalina || CSS || — || align=right data-sort-value="0.77" | 770 m || 
|-id=546 bgcolor=#fefefe
| 471546 ||  || — || March 15, 2012 || Mount Lemmon || Mount Lemmon Survey || — || align=right data-sort-value="0.72" | 720 m || 
|-id=547 bgcolor=#E9E9E9
| 471547 ||  || — || May 21, 2012 || Mount Lemmon || Mount Lemmon Survey || — || align=right | 1.5 km || 
|-id=548 bgcolor=#fefefe
| 471548 ||  || — || June 10, 2005 || Kitt Peak || Spacewatch || — || align=right data-sort-value="0.66" | 660 m || 
|-id=549 bgcolor=#E9E9E9
| 471549 ||  || — || June 14, 2008 || Kitt Peak || Spacewatch || — || align=right | 1.1 km || 
|-id=550 bgcolor=#fefefe
| 471550 ||  || — || May 24, 2001 || Socorro || LINEAR || — || align=right data-sort-value="0.89" | 890 m || 
|-id=551 bgcolor=#fefefe
| 471551 ||  || — || September 16, 2009 || Mount Lemmon || Mount Lemmon Survey || — || align=right data-sort-value="0.67" | 670 m || 
|-id=552 bgcolor=#fefefe
| 471552 ||  || — || November 12, 2005 || Socorro || LINEAR || — || align=right | 1.1 km || 
|-id=553 bgcolor=#E9E9E9
| 471553 ||  || — || September 24, 2008 || Mount Lemmon || Mount Lemmon Survey || — || align=right | 1.1 km || 
|-id=554 bgcolor=#fefefe
| 471554 ||  || — || February 16, 2007 || Mount Lemmon || Mount Lemmon Survey || — || align=right data-sort-value="0.96" | 960 m || 
|-id=555 bgcolor=#E9E9E9
| 471555 ||  || — || May 29, 2012 || Mount Lemmon || Mount Lemmon Survey || — || align=right | 1.7 km || 
|-id=556 bgcolor=#E9E9E9
| 471556 ||  || — || January 31, 2006 || Mount Lemmon || Mount Lemmon Survey || — || align=right | 1.4 km || 
|-id=557 bgcolor=#E9E9E9
| 471557 ||  || — || August 10, 2012 || Kitt Peak || Spacewatch || EUN || align=right | 1.1 km || 
|-id=558 bgcolor=#E9E9E9
| 471558 ||  || — || September 22, 2008 || Catalina || CSS || — || align=right | 1.2 km || 
|-id=559 bgcolor=#E9E9E9
| 471559 ||  || — || September 16, 2004 || Socorro || LINEAR || — || align=right | 1.1 km || 
|-id=560 bgcolor=#E9E9E9
| 471560 ||  || — || December 10, 2005 || Kitt Peak || Spacewatch || — || align=right data-sort-value="0.81" | 810 m || 
|-id=561 bgcolor=#E9E9E9
| 471561 ||  || — || July 18, 2012 || Catalina || CSS || — || align=right | 2.4 km || 
|-id=562 bgcolor=#E9E9E9
| 471562 ||  || — || September 28, 2008 || Catalina || CSS || (5) || align=right data-sort-value="0.66" | 660 m || 
|-id=563 bgcolor=#d6d6d6
| 471563 ||  || — || June 8, 2010 || WISE || WISE || — || align=right | 4.4 km || 
|-id=564 bgcolor=#fefefe
| 471564 ||  || — || December 18, 2009 || Kitt Peak || Spacewatch || — || align=right data-sort-value="0.73" | 730 m || 
|-id=565 bgcolor=#E9E9E9
| 471565 ||  || — || August 14, 2012 || Kitt Peak || Spacewatch || — || align=right | 1.7 km || 
|-id=566 bgcolor=#E9E9E9
| 471566 ||  || — || August 24, 2012 || Kitt Peak || Spacewatch || — || align=right | 1.6 km || 
|-id=567 bgcolor=#E9E9E9
| 471567 ||  || — || August 10, 2012 || Kitt Peak || Spacewatch || — || align=right | 1.6 km || 
|-id=568 bgcolor=#E9E9E9
| 471568 ||  || — || January 23, 2010 || WISE || WISE || — || align=right | 3.5 km || 
|-id=569 bgcolor=#E9E9E9
| 471569 ||  || — || February 18, 2010 || Kitt Peak || Spacewatch || — || align=right | 1.8 km || 
|-id=570 bgcolor=#E9E9E9
| 471570 ||  || — || September 3, 2008 || Kitt Peak || Spacewatch || — || align=right | 1.0 km || 
|-id=571 bgcolor=#fefefe
| 471571 ||  || — || September 3, 2008 || Kitt Peak || Spacewatch || — || align=right data-sort-value="0.90" | 900 m || 
|-id=572 bgcolor=#E9E9E9
| 471572 ||  || — || December 10, 2004 || Kitt Peak || Spacewatch || JUN || align=right | 1.1 km || 
|-id=573 bgcolor=#E9E9E9
| 471573 ||  || — || January 30, 2006 || Kitt Peak || Spacewatch || — || align=right | 1.6 km || 
|-id=574 bgcolor=#E9E9E9
| 471574 ||  || — || March 6, 2011 || Kitt Peak || Spacewatch || MAR || align=right data-sort-value="0.85" | 850 m || 
|-id=575 bgcolor=#E9E9E9
| 471575 ||  || — || August 25, 2012 || Catalina || CSS || — || align=right | 1.7 km || 
|-id=576 bgcolor=#fefefe
| 471576 ||  || — || March 16, 2007 || Mount Lemmon || Mount Lemmon Survey || — || align=right data-sort-value="0.88" | 880 m || 
|-id=577 bgcolor=#E9E9E9
| 471577 ||  || — || August 25, 2012 || Mount Lemmon || Mount Lemmon Survey || EUN || align=right | 1.3 km || 
|-id=578 bgcolor=#E9E9E9
| 471578 ||  || — || September 8, 2008 || Catalina || CSS || — || align=right | 1.8 km || 
|-id=579 bgcolor=#E9E9E9
| 471579 ||  || — || September 15, 2004 || Kitt Peak || Spacewatch || (5) || align=right data-sort-value="0.66" | 660 m || 
|-id=580 bgcolor=#E9E9E9
| 471580 ||  || — || September 26, 2008 || Kitt Peak || Spacewatch || — || align=right | 1.4 km || 
|-id=581 bgcolor=#E9E9E9
| 471581 ||  || — || June 23, 2012 || Mount Lemmon || Mount Lemmon Survey || — || align=right | 1.8 km || 
|-id=582 bgcolor=#fefefe
| 471582 ||  || — || July 13, 2004 || Siding Spring || SSS || — || align=right data-sort-value="0.94" | 940 m || 
|-id=583 bgcolor=#E9E9E9
| 471583 ||  || — || July 29, 2008 || Mount Lemmon || Mount Lemmon Survey || — || align=right | 1.5 km || 
|-id=584 bgcolor=#E9E9E9
| 471584 ||  || — || September 19, 1995 || Kitt Peak || Spacewatch || — || align=right | 1.0 km || 
|-id=585 bgcolor=#E9E9E9
| 471585 ||  || — || April 2, 2006 || Kitt Peak || Spacewatch || — || align=right | 2.4 km || 
|-id=586 bgcolor=#E9E9E9
| 471586 ||  || — || September 8, 1999 || Socorro || LINEAR || JUN || align=right | 1.3 km || 
|-id=587 bgcolor=#E9E9E9
| 471587 ||  || — || August 24, 2012 || Kitt Peak || Spacewatch || ADE || align=right | 2.1 km || 
|-id=588 bgcolor=#E9E9E9
| 471588 ||  || — || September 26, 1998 || Socorro || LINEAR || — || align=right | 2.5 km || 
|-id=589 bgcolor=#E9E9E9
| 471589 ||  || — || October 24, 2008 || Catalina || CSS || — || align=right | 1.5 km || 
|-id=590 bgcolor=#E9E9E9
| 471590 ||  || — || November 6, 2008 || Catalina || CSS || — || align=right | 1.6 km || 
|-id=591 bgcolor=#E9E9E9
| 471591 ||  || — || January 16, 2009 || Mount Lemmon || Mount Lemmon Survey || — || align=right | 1.7 km || 
|-id=592 bgcolor=#E9E9E9
| 471592 ||  || — || October 17, 1995 || Kitt Peak || Spacewatch || MIS || align=right | 2.1 km || 
|-id=593 bgcolor=#E9E9E9
| 471593 ||  || — || September 15, 2012 || Kitt Peak || Spacewatch || — || align=right | 1.3 km || 
|-id=594 bgcolor=#E9E9E9
| 471594 ||  || — || May 1, 2006 || Catalina || CSS || — || align=right | 2.7 km || 
|-id=595 bgcolor=#E9E9E9
| 471595 ||  || — || September 28, 2003 || Kitt Peak || Spacewatch || — || align=right | 1.9 km || 
|-id=596 bgcolor=#E9E9E9
| 471596 ||  || — || October 30, 2008 || Catalina || CSS || EUN || align=right | 1.4 km || 
|-id=597 bgcolor=#E9E9E9
| 471597 ||  || — || September 28, 1994 || Kitt Peak || Spacewatch || — || align=right | 1.5 km || 
|-id=598 bgcolor=#E9E9E9
| 471598 ||  || — || September 16, 2003 || Kitt Peak || Spacewatch || — || align=right | 2.3 km || 
|-id=599 bgcolor=#E9E9E9
| 471599 ||  || — || November 18, 2008 || Kitt Peak || Spacewatch || — || align=right | 1.4 km || 
|-id=600 bgcolor=#E9E9E9
| 471600 ||  || — || September 17, 2012 || Mount Lemmon || Mount Lemmon Survey || — || align=right | 2.0 km || 
|}

471601–471700 

|-bgcolor=#E9E9E9
| 471601 ||  || — || January 15, 2005 || Kitt Peak || Spacewatch || — || align=right | 1.3 km || 
|-id=602 bgcolor=#E9E9E9
| 471602 ||  || — || October 20, 2008 || Kitt Peak || Spacewatch || — || align=right | 1.5 km || 
|-id=603 bgcolor=#E9E9E9
| 471603 ||  || — || September 17, 2012 || Kitt Peak || Spacewatch || — || align=right | 2.0 km || 
|-id=604 bgcolor=#E9E9E9
| 471604 ||  || — || March 2, 2011 || Mount Lemmon || Mount Lemmon Survey || — || align=right | 1.3 km || 
|-id=605 bgcolor=#E9E9E9
| 471605 ||  || — || October 23, 2008 || Kitt Peak || Spacewatch || MIS || align=right | 1.9 km || 
|-id=606 bgcolor=#fefefe
| 471606 ||  || — || September 20, 2008 || Catalina || CSS || — || align=right | 1.0 km || 
|-id=607 bgcolor=#E9E9E9
| 471607 ||  || — || October 3, 2008 || Mount Lemmon || Mount Lemmon Survey || — || align=right data-sort-value="0.98" | 980 m || 
|-id=608 bgcolor=#E9E9E9
| 471608 ||  || — || September 28, 2008 || Mount Lemmon || Mount Lemmon Survey || — || align=right data-sort-value="0.89" | 890 m || 
|-id=609 bgcolor=#E9E9E9
| 471609 ||  || — || September 7, 2008 || Mount Lemmon || Mount Lemmon Survey || — || align=right data-sort-value="0.80" | 800 m || 
|-id=610 bgcolor=#E9E9E9
| 471610 ||  || — || March 2, 1997 || Kitt Peak || Spacewatch || — || align=right | 1.7 km || 
|-id=611 bgcolor=#E9E9E9
| 471611 ||  || — || October 9, 2004 || Kitt Peak || Spacewatch || — || align=right data-sort-value="0.73" | 730 m || 
|-id=612 bgcolor=#FA8072
| 471612 ||  || — || March 16, 2005 || Mount Lemmon || Mount Lemmon Survey || — || align=right data-sort-value="0.81" | 810 m || 
|-id=613 bgcolor=#E9E9E9
| 471613 ||  || — || September 16, 2012 || Catalina || CSS || — || align=right | 2.1 km || 
|-id=614 bgcolor=#E9E9E9
| 471614 ||  || — || October 30, 2008 || Mount Lemmon || Mount Lemmon Survey || RAF || align=right data-sort-value="0.88" | 880 m || 
|-id=615 bgcolor=#E9E9E9
| 471615 ||  || — || December 4, 2008 || Mount Lemmon || Mount Lemmon Survey || — || align=right | 1.6 km || 
|-id=616 bgcolor=#E9E9E9
| 471616 ||  || — || September 22, 2012 || Kitt Peak || Spacewatch || — || align=right | 2.1 km || 
|-id=617 bgcolor=#E9E9E9
| 471617 ||  || — || October 9, 2008 || Mount Lemmon || Mount Lemmon Survey || — || align=right data-sort-value="0.79" | 790 m || 
|-id=618 bgcolor=#d6d6d6
| 471618 ||  || — || April 6, 2005 || Kitt Peak || Spacewatch || EOS || align=right | 2.0 km || 
|-id=619 bgcolor=#E9E9E9
| 471619 ||  || — || February 17, 2010 || Kitt Peak || Spacewatch || EUN || align=right | 1.4 km || 
|-id=620 bgcolor=#E9E9E9
| 471620 ||  || — || April 25, 2007 || Kitt Peak || Spacewatch || — || align=right | 1.7 km || 
|-id=621 bgcolor=#E9E9E9
| 471621 ||  || — || March 3, 2005 || Catalina || CSS || AGN || align=right | 1.5 km || 
|-id=622 bgcolor=#E9E9E9
| 471622 ||  || — || September 13, 2007 || Mount Lemmon || Mount Lemmon Survey || — || align=right | 2.0 km || 
|-id=623 bgcolor=#E9E9E9
| 471623 ||  || — || September 15, 2012 || Mount Lemmon || Mount Lemmon Survey || — || align=right | 1.5 km || 
|-id=624 bgcolor=#E9E9E9
| 471624 ||  || — || October 31, 2008 || Kitt Peak || Spacewatch || — || align=right | 1.3 km || 
|-id=625 bgcolor=#d6d6d6
| 471625 ||  || — || April 10, 2010 || Mount Lemmon || Mount Lemmon Survey || — || align=right | 3.1 km || 
|-id=626 bgcolor=#E9E9E9
| 471626 ||  || — || May 8, 2006 || Mount Lemmon || Mount Lemmon Survey || GEF || align=right | 1.3 km || 
|-id=627 bgcolor=#E9E9E9
| 471627 ||  || — || January 30, 2006 || Kitt Peak || Spacewatch || — || align=right | 1.7 km || 
|-id=628 bgcolor=#E9E9E9
| 471628 ||  || — || March 6, 2011 || Kitt Peak || Spacewatch || — || align=right | 1.6 km || 
|-id=629 bgcolor=#E9E9E9
| 471629 ||  || — || September 25, 2012 || Kitt Peak || Spacewatch || — || align=right | 1.7 km || 
|-id=630 bgcolor=#E9E9E9
| 471630 ||  || — || September 26, 2012 || Catalina || CSS || JUN || align=right | 1.2 km || 
|-id=631 bgcolor=#E9E9E9
| 471631 ||  || — || October 19, 2003 || Kitt Peak || Spacewatch || — || align=right | 1.7 km || 
|-id=632 bgcolor=#E9E9E9
| 471632 ||  || — || March 23, 2006 || Mount Lemmon || Mount Lemmon Survey || EUN || align=right | 1.2 km || 
|-id=633 bgcolor=#E9E9E9
| 471633 ||  || — || October 25, 2008 || Kitt Peak || Spacewatch || EUN || align=right | 1.0 km || 
|-id=634 bgcolor=#E9E9E9
| 471634 ||  || — || September 24, 2008 || Mount Lemmon || Mount Lemmon Survey || — || align=right data-sort-value="0.71" | 710 m || 
|-id=635 bgcolor=#E9E9E9
| 471635 ||  || — || January 29, 2009 || Mount Lemmon || Mount Lemmon Survey ||  || align=right | 2.4 km || 
|-id=636 bgcolor=#E9E9E9
| 471636 ||  || — || October 3, 2003 || Kitt Peak || Spacewatch || — || align=right | 1.8 km || 
|-id=637 bgcolor=#E9E9E9
| 471637 ||  || — || October 25, 2003 || Kitt Peak || Spacewatch || — || align=right | 1.9 km || 
|-id=638 bgcolor=#E9E9E9
| 471638 ||  || — || October 6, 2008 || Mount Lemmon || Mount Lemmon Survey || (5) || align=right data-sort-value="0.90" | 900 m || 
|-id=639 bgcolor=#E9E9E9
| 471639 ||  || — || August 21, 2003 || Campo Imperatore || CINEOS || — || align=right | 1.1 km || 
|-id=640 bgcolor=#E9E9E9
| 471640 ||  || — || October 8, 2012 || Mount Lemmon || Mount Lemmon Survey || — || align=right | 1.9 km || 
|-id=641 bgcolor=#d6d6d6
| 471641 ||  || — || September 17, 2012 || Mount Lemmon || Mount Lemmon Survey || — || align=right | 2.3 km || 
|-id=642 bgcolor=#E9E9E9
| 471642 ||  || — || September 14, 2007 || Mount Lemmon || Mount Lemmon Survey || — || align=right | 2.2 km || 
|-id=643 bgcolor=#E9E9E9
| 471643 ||  || — || September 18, 2003 || Kitt Peak || Spacewatch || — || align=right | 1.8 km || 
|-id=644 bgcolor=#E9E9E9
| 471644 ||  || — || January 17, 2005 || Socorro || LINEAR || — || align=right | 1.5 km || 
|-id=645 bgcolor=#E9E9E9
| 471645 ||  || — || October 23, 2008 || Kitt Peak || Spacewatch || — || align=right | 1.4 km || 
|-id=646 bgcolor=#E9E9E9
| 471646 ||  || — || September 21, 2012 || Kitt Peak || Spacewatch || — || align=right | 1.3 km || 
|-id=647 bgcolor=#E9E9E9
| 471647 ||  || — || January 26, 2009 || Mount Lemmon || Mount Lemmon Survey || AEO || align=right data-sort-value="0.83" | 830 m || 
|-id=648 bgcolor=#d6d6d6
| 471648 ||  || — || October 21, 2007 || Mount Lemmon || Mount Lemmon Survey || LIX || align=right | 4.4 km || 
|-id=649 bgcolor=#E9E9E9
| 471649 ||  || — || September 16, 2012 || Kitt Peak || Spacewatch || — || align=right | 1.7 km || 
|-id=650 bgcolor=#E9E9E9
| 471650 ||  || — || October 10, 2012 || Mount Lemmon || Mount Lemmon Survey || EUN || align=right | 1.5 km || 
|-id=651 bgcolor=#E9E9E9
| 471651 ||  || — || September 30, 2003 || Kitt Peak || Spacewatch || — || align=right | 1.9 km || 
|-id=652 bgcolor=#E9E9E9
| 471652 ||  || — || September 25, 2012 || Kitt Peak || Spacewatch || — || align=right | 2.4 km || 
|-id=653 bgcolor=#E9E9E9
| 471653 ||  || — || December 2, 2008 || Kitt Peak || Spacewatch || — || align=right | 1.9 km || 
|-id=654 bgcolor=#E9E9E9
| 471654 ||  || — || July 29, 2008 || Mount Lemmon || Mount Lemmon Survey || EUN || align=right | 1.1 km || 
|-id=655 bgcolor=#E9E9E9
| 471655 ||  || — || October 7, 1977 || Palomar || PLS || EUN || align=right | 1.4 km || 
|-id=656 bgcolor=#E9E9E9
| 471656 ||  || — || March 12, 2010 || Mount Lemmon || Mount Lemmon Survey || EUN || align=right | 1.4 km || 
|-id=657 bgcolor=#E9E9E9
| 471657 ||  || — || October 7, 2008 || Mount Lemmon || Mount Lemmon Survey || (5) || align=right data-sort-value="0.82" | 820 m || 
|-id=658 bgcolor=#E9E9E9
| 471658 ||  || — || September 18, 2003 || Kitt Peak || Spacewatch || NEM || align=right | 1.9 km || 
|-id=659 bgcolor=#E9E9E9
| 471659 ||  || — || October 8, 2012 || Mount Lemmon || Mount Lemmon Survey || — || align=right | 2.4 km || 
|-id=660 bgcolor=#E9E9E9
| 471660 ||  || — || October 8, 2012 || Mount Lemmon || Mount Lemmon Survey || — || align=right | 1.7 km || 
|-id=661 bgcolor=#E9E9E9
| 471661 ||  || — || March 13, 2011 || Mount Lemmon || Mount Lemmon Survey || — || align=right | 1.4 km || 
|-id=662 bgcolor=#E9E9E9
| 471662 ||  || — || August 24, 2008 || Kitt Peak || Spacewatch || MAR || align=right data-sort-value="0.81" | 810 m || 
|-id=663 bgcolor=#E9E9E9
| 471663 ||  || — || October 24, 2008 || Catalina || CSS || EUN || align=right | 1.6 km || 
|-id=664 bgcolor=#E9E9E9
| 471664 ||  || — || October 8, 2012 || Mount Lemmon || Mount Lemmon Survey || — || align=right | 1.5 km || 
|-id=665 bgcolor=#E9E9E9
| 471665 ||  || — || September 28, 2003 || Kitt Peak || Spacewatch || — || align=right | 1.8 km || 
|-id=666 bgcolor=#E9E9E9
| 471666 ||  || — || September 19, 2012 || Mount Lemmon || Mount Lemmon Survey || — || align=right | 2.4 km || 
|-id=667 bgcolor=#E9E9E9
| 471667 ||  || — || October 8, 2012 || Mount Lemmon || Mount Lemmon Survey || — || align=right | 1.3 km || 
|-id=668 bgcolor=#E9E9E9
| 471668 ||  || — || October 8, 2012 || Mount Lemmon || Mount Lemmon Survey || HOF || align=right | 2.1 km || 
|-id=669 bgcolor=#E9E9E9
| 471669 ||  || — || February 9, 2005 || Mount Lemmon || Mount Lemmon Survey || — || align=right | 1.3 km || 
|-id=670 bgcolor=#E9E9E9
| 471670 ||  || — || April 26, 2006 || Kitt Peak || Spacewatch || — || align=right | 1.7 km || 
|-id=671 bgcolor=#E9E9E9
| 471671 ||  || — || October 29, 2003 || Kitt Peak || Spacewatch || GEF || align=right | 1.2 km || 
|-id=672 bgcolor=#E9E9E9
| 471672 ||  || — || October 9, 2012 || Kitt Peak || Spacewatch || — || align=right | 2.1 km || 
|-id=673 bgcolor=#E9E9E9
| 471673 ||  || — || September 19, 2003 || Kitt Peak || Spacewatch || EUN || align=right data-sort-value="0.86" | 860 m || 
|-id=674 bgcolor=#E9E9E9
| 471674 ||  || — || October 25, 2008 || Kitt Peak || Spacewatch || WIT || align=right data-sort-value="0.88" | 880 m || 
|-id=675 bgcolor=#E9E9E9
| 471675 ||  || — || September 19, 2003 || Kitt Peak || Spacewatch || NEM || align=right | 1.9 km || 
|-id=676 bgcolor=#d6d6d6
| 471676 ||  || — || October 15, 2001 || Socorro || LINEAR || — || align=right | 3.7 km || 
|-id=677 bgcolor=#d6d6d6
| 471677 ||  || — || October 9, 2012 || Mount Lemmon || Mount Lemmon Survey || — || align=right | 2.7 km || 
|-id=678 bgcolor=#E9E9E9
| 471678 ||  || — || October 28, 2008 || Kitt Peak || Spacewatch || — || align=right | 1.2 km || 
|-id=679 bgcolor=#E9E9E9
| 471679 ||  || — || December 21, 2008 || Catalina || CSS || — || align=right | 1.6 km || 
|-id=680 bgcolor=#d6d6d6
| 471680 ||  || — || September 24, 2007 || Kitt Peak || Spacewatch || — || align=right | 2.3 km || 
|-id=681 bgcolor=#E9E9E9
| 471681 ||  || — || October 21, 2008 || Kitt Peak || Spacewatch || — || align=right | 1.00 km || 
|-id=682 bgcolor=#d6d6d6
| 471682 ||  || — || August 28, 2012 || Mount Lemmon || Mount Lemmon Survey || — || align=right | 3.3 km || 
|-id=683 bgcolor=#E9E9E9
| 471683 ||  || — || February 4, 2006 || Kitt Peak || Spacewatch || — || align=right | 1.4 km || 
|-id=684 bgcolor=#d6d6d6
| 471684 ||  || — || September 25, 2007 || Mount Lemmon || Mount Lemmon Survey || — || align=right | 2.6 km || 
|-id=685 bgcolor=#E9E9E9
| 471685 ||  || — || September 24, 2012 || Kitt Peak || Spacewatch || — || align=right | 2.2 km || 
|-id=686 bgcolor=#d6d6d6
| 471686 ||  || — || October 21, 2007 || Mount Lemmon || Mount Lemmon Survey || — || align=right | 2.8 km || 
|-id=687 bgcolor=#E9E9E9
| 471687 ||  || — || September 25, 2012 || Kitt Peak || Spacewatch || — || align=right | 2.0 km || 
|-id=688 bgcolor=#E9E9E9
| 471688 ||  || — || September 17, 2012 || Mount Lemmon || Mount Lemmon Survey || — || align=right | 1.8 km || 
|-id=689 bgcolor=#E9E9E9
| 471689 ||  || — || November 24, 2008 || Kitt Peak || Spacewatch || — || align=right | 1.1 km || 
|-id=690 bgcolor=#E9E9E9
| 471690 ||  || — || November 7, 2008 || Mount Lemmon || Mount Lemmon Survey || — || align=right | 1.7 km || 
|-id=691 bgcolor=#E9E9E9
| 471691 ||  || — || August 22, 2007 || Anderson Mesa || LONEOS || — || align=right | 2.1 km || 
|-id=692 bgcolor=#fefefe
| 471692 ||  || — || September 25, 2008 || Mount Lemmon || Mount Lemmon Survey || — || align=right data-sort-value="0.69" | 690 m || 
|-id=693 bgcolor=#E9E9E9
| 471693 ||  || — || June 4, 2011 || Mount Lemmon || Mount Lemmon Survey || — || align=right | 1.8 km || 
|-id=694 bgcolor=#E9E9E9
| 471694 ||  || — || September 27, 2008 || Mount Lemmon || Mount Lemmon Survey || (5) || align=right data-sort-value="0.79" | 790 m || 
|-id=695 bgcolor=#E9E9E9
| 471695 ||  || — || October 8, 2012 || Mount Lemmon || Mount Lemmon Survey || AGN || align=right | 1.1 km || 
|-id=696 bgcolor=#E9E9E9
| 471696 ||  || — || September 25, 1998 || Kitt Peak || Spacewatch || — || align=right | 2.3 km || 
|-id=697 bgcolor=#d6d6d6
| 471697 ||  || — || September 15, 2012 || Kitt Peak || Spacewatch || EOS || align=right | 1.7 km || 
|-id=698 bgcolor=#E9E9E9
| 471698 ||  || — || November 19, 2008 || Mount Lemmon || Mount Lemmon Survey || — || align=right | 1.3 km || 
|-id=699 bgcolor=#E9E9E9
| 471699 ||  || — || December 22, 2008 || Kitt Peak || Spacewatch || — || align=right | 2.1 km || 
|-id=700 bgcolor=#E9E9E9
| 471700 ||  || — || November 16, 1995 || Kitt Peak || Spacewatch || — || align=right | 1.5 km || 
|}

471701–471800 

|-bgcolor=#E9E9E9
| 471701 ||  || — || September 27, 2003 || Kitt Peak || Spacewatch || — || align=right | 1.7 km || 
|-id=702 bgcolor=#d6d6d6
| 471702 ||  || — || July 28, 2011 || Siding Spring || SSS || — || align=right | 2.7 km || 
|-id=703 bgcolor=#E9E9E9
| 471703 ||  || — || April 8, 2010 || Kitt Peak || Spacewatch || NEM || align=right | 2.0 km || 
|-id=704 bgcolor=#E9E9E9
| 471704 ||  || — || January 27, 2006 || Kitt Peak || Spacewatch || EUN || align=right | 1.1 km || 
|-id=705 bgcolor=#E9E9E9
| 471705 ||  || — || October 11, 2012 || Mount Lemmon || Mount Lemmon Survey || — || align=right | 1.9 km || 
|-id=706 bgcolor=#E9E9E9
| 471706 ||  || — || October 10, 2012 || Mount Lemmon || Mount Lemmon Survey || GEF || align=right | 1.3 km || 
|-id=707 bgcolor=#E9E9E9
| 471707 ||  || — || February 7, 1997 || Kitt Peak || Spacewatch || MAR || align=right | 1.1 km || 
|-id=708 bgcolor=#E9E9E9
| 471708 ||  || — || September 11, 2007 || Kitt Peak || Spacewatch || — || align=right | 1.8 km || 
|-id=709 bgcolor=#E9E9E9
| 471709 ||  || — || December 20, 2004 || Mount Lemmon || Mount Lemmon Survey || — || align=right | 1.5 km || 
|-id=710 bgcolor=#d6d6d6
| 471710 ||  || — || October 11, 2006 || Kitt Peak || Spacewatch || — || align=right | 3.1 km || 
|-id=711 bgcolor=#d6d6d6
| 471711 ||  || — || October 15, 2012 || Mount Lemmon || Mount Lemmon Survey || — || align=right | 2.3 km || 
|-id=712 bgcolor=#E9E9E9
| 471712 ||  || — || September 17, 2003 || Kitt Peak || Spacewatch || MRX || align=right data-sort-value="0.93" | 930 m || 
|-id=713 bgcolor=#E9E9E9
| 471713 ||  || — || September 27, 2008 || Mount Lemmon || Mount Lemmon Survey || MAR || align=right data-sort-value="0.89" | 890 m || 
|-id=714 bgcolor=#E9E9E9
| 471714 ||  || — || November 7, 2008 || Catalina || CSS || — || align=right data-sort-value="0.94" | 940 m || 
|-id=715 bgcolor=#E9E9E9
| 471715 ||  || — || December 4, 2008 || Kitt Peak || Spacewatch || (5) || align=right data-sort-value="0.82" | 820 m || 
|-id=716 bgcolor=#E9E9E9
| 471716 ||  || — || October 26, 2008 || Catalina || CSS || — || align=right | 1.4 km || 
|-id=717 bgcolor=#E9E9E9
| 471717 ||  || — || October 13, 2012 || Catalina || CSS || — || align=right | 1.9 km || 
|-id=718 bgcolor=#E9E9E9
| 471718 ||  || — || October 19, 2003 || Kitt Peak || Spacewatch || — || align=right | 2.1 km || 
|-id=719 bgcolor=#E9E9E9
| 471719 ||  || — || December 15, 2004 || Kitt Peak || Spacewatch || — || align=right | 1.9 km || 
|-id=720 bgcolor=#E9E9E9
| 471720 ||  || — || December 7, 1999 || Socorro || LINEAR || — || align=right | 1.6 km || 
|-id=721 bgcolor=#E9E9E9
| 471721 ||  || — || April 11, 2007 || Kitt Peak || Spacewatch || (194) || align=right | 1.2 km || 
|-id=722 bgcolor=#E9E9E9
| 471722 ||  || — || June 21, 2007 || Mount Lemmon || Mount Lemmon Survey || — || align=right | 1.6 km || 
|-id=723 bgcolor=#d6d6d6
| 471723 ||  || — || March 25, 2010 || Kitt Peak || Spacewatch || — || align=right | 3.1 km || 
|-id=724 bgcolor=#E9E9E9
| 471724 ||  || — || October 16, 2012 || Mount Lemmon || Mount Lemmon Survey || AGN || align=right | 1.1 km || 
|-id=725 bgcolor=#E9E9E9
| 471725 ||  || — || October 16, 2012 || Mount Lemmon || Mount Lemmon Survey || HOF || align=right | 2.3 km || 
|-id=726 bgcolor=#E9E9E9
| 471726 ||  || — || September 18, 2012 || Kitt Peak || Spacewatch || — || align=right | 2.2 km || 
|-id=727 bgcolor=#E9E9E9
| 471727 ||  || — || March 14, 2010 || Mount Lemmon || Mount Lemmon Survey || — || align=right | 2.4 km || 
|-id=728 bgcolor=#d6d6d6
| 471728 ||  || — || December 29, 2008 || Mount Lemmon || Mount Lemmon Survey || EOS || align=right | 1.6 km || 
|-id=729 bgcolor=#E9E9E9
| 471729 ||  || — || September 18, 2004 || Socorro || LINEAR || — || align=right | 1.0 km || 
|-id=730 bgcolor=#E9E9E9
| 471730 ||  || — || December 1, 2003 || Kitt Peak || Spacewatch || — || align=right | 1.9 km || 
|-id=731 bgcolor=#E9E9E9
| 471731 ||  || — || October 8, 2012 || Kitt Peak || Spacewatch || — || align=right | 2.2 km || 
|-id=732 bgcolor=#E9E9E9
| 471732 ||  || — || October 20, 2003 || Kitt Peak || Spacewatch || — || align=right | 2.3 km || 
|-id=733 bgcolor=#E9E9E9
| 471733 ||  || — || September 20, 2003 || Kitt Peak || Spacewatch || — || align=right | 1.8 km || 
|-id=734 bgcolor=#E9E9E9
| 471734 ||  || — || September 23, 2012 || Mount Lemmon || Mount Lemmon Survey || — || align=right | 2.5 km || 
|-id=735 bgcolor=#d6d6d6
| 471735 ||  || — || June 27, 2011 || Mount Lemmon || Mount Lemmon Survey || — || align=right | 2.6 km || 
|-id=736 bgcolor=#E9E9E9
| 471736 ||  || — || October 9, 2012 || Kitt Peak || Spacewatch || — || align=right | 1.5 km || 
|-id=737 bgcolor=#E9E9E9
| 471737 ||  || — || October 16, 2003 || Kitt Peak || Spacewatch || — || align=right | 2.0 km || 
|-id=738 bgcolor=#E9E9E9
| 471738 ||  || — || October 24, 2003 || Kitt Peak || Spacewatch || PAD || align=right | 1.4 km || 
|-id=739 bgcolor=#E9E9E9
| 471739 ||  || — || September 30, 2003 || Kitt Peak || Spacewatch || MRX || align=right data-sort-value="0.76" | 760 m || 
|-id=740 bgcolor=#E9E9E9
| 471740 ||  || — || May 1, 2010 || WISE || WISE || — || align=right | 4.4 km || 
|-id=741 bgcolor=#E9E9E9
| 471741 ||  || — || January 16, 2005 || Kitt Peak || Spacewatch || — || align=right | 1.2 km || 
|-id=742 bgcolor=#E9E9E9
| 471742 ||  || — || December 22, 2008 || Kitt Peak || Spacewatch || AST || align=right | 1.4 km || 
|-id=743 bgcolor=#E9E9E9
| 471743 ||  || — || October 26, 1994 || Kitt Peak || Spacewatch || — || align=right | 1.3 km || 
|-id=744 bgcolor=#E9E9E9
| 471744 ||  || — || September 13, 2007 || Mount Lemmon || Mount Lemmon Survey || — || align=right | 2.3 km || 
|-id=745 bgcolor=#E9E9E9
| 471745 ||  || — || October 5, 2012 || Kitt Peak || Spacewatch || — || align=right | 2.1 km || 
|-id=746 bgcolor=#E9E9E9
| 471746 ||  || — || December 4, 2008 || Mount Lemmon || Mount Lemmon Survey || KONfast? || align=right | 2.0 km || 
|-id=747 bgcolor=#d6d6d6
| 471747 ||  || — || October 14, 2007 || Mount Lemmon || Mount Lemmon Survey || — || align=right | 3.2 km || 
|-id=748 bgcolor=#E9E9E9
| 471748 ||  || — || September 25, 2012 || Mount Lemmon || Mount Lemmon Survey || — || align=right | 1.7 km || 
|-id=749 bgcolor=#E9E9E9
| 471749 ||  || — || November 30, 2008 || Kitt Peak || Spacewatch || EUN || align=right | 1.0 km || 
|-id=750 bgcolor=#E9E9E9
| 471750 ||  || — || December 1, 2003 || Kitt Peak || Spacewatch || AEO || align=right data-sort-value="0.85" | 850 m || 
|-id=751 bgcolor=#E9E9E9
| 471751 ||  || — || September 21, 2003 || Kitt Peak || Spacewatch || — || align=right | 1.7 km || 
|-id=752 bgcolor=#E9E9E9
| 471752 ||  || — || April 29, 2006 || Kitt Peak || Spacewatch || — || align=right | 2.3 km || 
|-id=753 bgcolor=#E9E9E9
| 471753 ||  || — || October 20, 2003 || Kitt Peak || Spacewatch || — || align=right | 1.8 km || 
|-id=754 bgcolor=#E9E9E9
| 471754 ||  || — || April 24, 2006 || Kitt Peak || Spacewatch || — || align=right | 1.7 km || 
|-id=755 bgcolor=#d6d6d6
| 471755 ||  || — || October 16, 2006 || Kitt Peak || Spacewatch || — || align=right | 2.7 km || 
|-id=756 bgcolor=#d6d6d6
| 471756 ||  || — || October 24, 1995 || Kitt Peak || Spacewatch || VER || align=right | 2.3 km || 
|-id=757 bgcolor=#E9E9E9
| 471757 ||  || — || October 25, 2008 || Kitt Peak || Spacewatch || — || align=right | 1.0 km || 
|-id=758 bgcolor=#E9E9E9
| 471758 ||  || — || October 23, 2003 || Kitt Peak || Spacewatch || — || align=right | 1.8 km || 
|-id=759 bgcolor=#d6d6d6
| 471759 ||  || — || October 15, 2012 || Kitt Peak || Spacewatch || — || align=right | 2.8 km || 
|-id=760 bgcolor=#d6d6d6
| 471760 ||  || — || August 28, 2006 || Kitt Peak || Spacewatch || — || align=right | 2.1 km || 
|-id=761 bgcolor=#E9E9E9
| 471761 ||  || — || November 6, 2008 || Catalina || CSS || — || align=right | 1.1 km || 
|-id=762 bgcolor=#E9E9E9
| 471762 ||  || — || September 16, 2012 || Kitt Peak || Spacewatch || — || align=right | 1.8 km || 
|-id=763 bgcolor=#E9E9E9
| 471763 ||  || — || September 28, 2003 || Kitt Peak || Spacewatch || — || align=right | 1.9 km || 
|-id=764 bgcolor=#E9E9E9
| 471764 ||  || — || September 25, 2012 || Mount Lemmon || Mount Lemmon Survey || — || align=right | 1.8 km || 
|-id=765 bgcolor=#d6d6d6
| 471765 ||  || — || November 3, 2007 || Kitt Peak || Spacewatch || — || align=right | 2.7 km || 
|-id=766 bgcolor=#E9E9E9
| 471766 ||  || — || October 3, 2003 || Kitt Peak || Spacewatch || — || align=right | 1.4 km || 
|-id=767 bgcolor=#E9E9E9
| 471767 ||  || — || December 1, 2003 || Kitt Peak || Spacewatch || GEF || align=right data-sort-value="0.87" | 870 m || 
|-id=768 bgcolor=#E9E9E9
| 471768 ||  || — || September 11, 2007 || Catalina || CSS || — || align=right | 2.1 km || 
|-id=769 bgcolor=#E9E9E9
| 471769 ||  || — || October 10, 1999 || Socorro || LINEAR || — || align=right | 1.3 km || 
|-id=770 bgcolor=#E9E9E9
| 471770 ||  || — || August 11, 2007 || Anderson Mesa || LONEOS || DOR || align=right | 2.6 km || 
|-id=771 bgcolor=#E9E9E9
| 471771 ||  || — || February 13, 2010 || Mount Lemmon || Mount Lemmon Survey || — || align=right | 1.6 km || 
|-id=772 bgcolor=#E9E9E9
| 471772 ||  || — || October 10, 2012 || Mount Lemmon || Mount Lemmon Survey || — || align=right | 1.9 km || 
|-id=773 bgcolor=#d6d6d6
| 471773 ||  || — || October 6, 1996 || Kitt Peak || Spacewatch || — || align=right | 2.4 km || 
|-id=774 bgcolor=#E9E9E9
| 471774 ||  || — || December 30, 2008 || Kitt Peak || Spacewatch || AGN || align=right | 1.1 km || 
|-id=775 bgcolor=#E9E9E9
| 471775 ||  || — || December 1, 2008 || Kitt Peak || Spacewatch || — || align=right | 1.8 km || 
|-id=776 bgcolor=#E9E9E9
| 471776 ||  || — || April 10, 2010 || Mount Lemmon || Mount Lemmon Survey || — || align=right | 1.8 km || 
|-id=777 bgcolor=#d6d6d6
| 471777 ||  || — || October 21, 2012 || Kitt Peak || Spacewatch || EOS || align=right | 1.9 km || 
|-id=778 bgcolor=#E9E9E9
| 471778 ||  || — || September 21, 2003 || Anderson Mesa || LONEOS || JUN || align=right data-sort-value="0.98" | 980 m || 
|-id=779 bgcolor=#E9E9E9
| 471779 ||  || — || November 20, 2003 || Socorro || LINEAR || — || align=right | 2.5 km || 
|-id=780 bgcolor=#E9E9E9
| 471780 ||  || — || November 20, 2008 || Kitt Peak || Spacewatch || — || align=right | 1.3 km || 
|-id=781 bgcolor=#E9E9E9
| 471781 ||  || — || September 16, 2003 || Kitt Peak || Spacewatch || — || align=right | 1.2 km || 
|-id=782 bgcolor=#d6d6d6
| 471782 ||  || — || July 30, 2010 || WISE || WISE || — || align=right | 3.2 km || 
|-id=783 bgcolor=#E9E9E9
| 471783 ||  || — || September 14, 2007 || Catalina || CSS || — || align=right | 2.2 km || 
|-id=784 bgcolor=#d6d6d6
| 471784 ||  || — || April 11, 2010 || Mount Lemmon || Mount Lemmon Survey || KOR || align=right | 1.2 km || 
|-id=785 bgcolor=#E9E9E9
| 471785 ||  || — || October 14, 1999 || Kitt Peak || Spacewatch || — || align=right | 1.2 km || 
|-id=786 bgcolor=#d6d6d6
| 471786 ||  || — || October 7, 2007 || Mount Lemmon || Mount Lemmon Survey || — || align=right | 3.9 km || 
|-id=787 bgcolor=#E9E9E9
| 471787 ||  || — || February 9, 2005 || Mount Lemmon || Mount Lemmon Survey || — || align=right | 2.2 km || 
|-id=788 bgcolor=#E9E9E9
| 471788 ||  || — || June 13, 2010 || WISE || WISE || — || align=right | 2.9 km || 
|-id=789 bgcolor=#E9E9E9
| 471789 ||  || — || November 19, 2003 || Anderson Mesa || LONEOS || — || align=right | 2.3 km || 
|-id=790 bgcolor=#E9E9E9
| 471790 ||  || — || May 26, 2007 || Mount Lemmon || Mount Lemmon Survey || — || align=right | 1.3 km || 
|-id=791 bgcolor=#d6d6d6
| 471791 ||  || — || October 20, 2012 || Kitt Peak || Spacewatch || — || align=right | 3.5 km || 
|-id=792 bgcolor=#E9E9E9
| 471792 ||  || — || April 2, 2006 || Kitt Peak || Spacewatch || — || align=right | 1.5 km || 
|-id=793 bgcolor=#E9E9E9
| 471793 ||  || — || September 23, 2008 || Mount Lemmon || Mount Lemmon Survey || — || align=right data-sort-value="0.94" | 940 m || 
|-id=794 bgcolor=#d6d6d6
| 471794 ||  || — || November 6, 2012 || Kitt Peak || Spacewatch || EOS || align=right | 2.3 km || 
|-id=795 bgcolor=#d6d6d6
| 471795 ||  || — || September 17, 2006 || Kitt Peak || Spacewatch || — || align=right | 2.8 km || 
|-id=796 bgcolor=#E9E9E9
| 471796 ||  || — || November 18, 2003 || Kitt Peak || Spacewatch || — || align=right | 1.8 km || 
|-id=797 bgcolor=#d6d6d6
| 471797 ||  || — || September 14, 2007 || Mount Lemmon || Mount Lemmon Survey || KOR || align=right | 1.3 km || 
|-id=798 bgcolor=#d6d6d6
| 471798 ||  || — || November 6, 2012 || Kitt Peak || Spacewatch || — || align=right | 2.7 km || 
|-id=799 bgcolor=#E9E9E9
| 471799 ||  || — || September 21, 2003 || Anderson Mesa || LONEOS || — || align=right | 1.2 km || 
|-id=800 bgcolor=#d6d6d6
| 471800 ||  || — || October 8, 2007 || Kitt Peak || Spacewatch || KOR || align=right | 1.2 km || 
|}

471801–471900 

|-bgcolor=#d6d6d6
| 471801 ||  || — || November 14, 2012 || Kitt Peak || Spacewatch || — || align=right | 3.5 km || 
|-id=802 bgcolor=#d6d6d6
| 471802 ||  || — || November 2, 2007 || Kitt Peak || Spacewatch || — || align=right | 2.0 km || 
|-id=803 bgcolor=#E9E9E9
| 471803 ||  || — || September 19, 2012 || Mount Lemmon || Mount Lemmon Survey || ADE || align=right | 1.8 km || 
|-id=804 bgcolor=#E9E9E9
| 471804 ||  || — || October 22, 1995 || Kitt Peak || Spacewatch || — || align=right | 1.3 km || 
|-id=805 bgcolor=#E9E9E9
| 471805 ||  || — || November 18, 2008 || Kitt Peak || Spacewatch || EUN || align=right | 1.3 km || 
|-id=806 bgcolor=#E9E9E9
| 471806 ||  || — || December 29, 2008 || Kitt Peak || Spacewatch || AGN || align=right | 1.0 km || 
|-id=807 bgcolor=#d6d6d6
| 471807 ||  || — || October 17, 2012 || Mount Lemmon || Mount Lemmon Survey || — || align=right | 2.4 km || 
|-id=808 bgcolor=#E9E9E9
| 471808 ||  || — || October 9, 2012 || Mount Lemmon || Mount Lemmon Survey || — || align=right | 1.5 km || 
|-id=809 bgcolor=#d6d6d6
| 471809 ||  || — || September 18, 2006 || Kitt Peak || Spacewatch || — || align=right | 2.5 km || 
|-id=810 bgcolor=#E9E9E9
| 471810 ||  || — || February 1, 2009 || Mount Lemmon || Mount Lemmon Survey || — || align=right | 2.1 km || 
|-id=811 bgcolor=#d6d6d6
| 471811 ||  || — || November 5, 2007 || Kitt Peak || Spacewatch || EOS || align=right | 2.1 km || 
|-id=812 bgcolor=#d6d6d6
| 471812 ||  || — || November 14, 2007 || Kitt Peak || Spacewatch || — || align=right | 2.2 km || 
|-id=813 bgcolor=#d6d6d6
| 471813 ||  || — || October 9, 2012 || Mount Lemmon || Mount Lemmon Survey || — || align=right | 2.5 km || 
|-id=814 bgcolor=#d6d6d6
| 471814 ||  || — || October 10, 2007 || Mount Lemmon || Mount Lemmon Survey || KOR || align=right | 1.2 km || 
|-id=815 bgcolor=#d6d6d6
| 471815 ||  || — || September 18, 2007 || Mount Lemmon || Mount Lemmon Survey || — || align=right | 2.2 km || 
|-id=816 bgcolor=#d6d6d6
| 471816 ||  || — || November 19, 2012 || Kitt Peak || Spacewatch || — || align=right | 2.6 km || 
|-id=817 bgcolor=#d6d6d6
| 471817 ||  || — || September 25, 2012 || Mount Lemmon || Mount Lemmon Survey || — || align=right | 3.3 km || 
|-id=818 bgcolor=#E9E9E9
| 471818 ||  || — || September 25, 2012 || Mount Lemmon || Mount Lemmon Survey || — || align=right | 1.3 km || 
|-id=819 bgcolor=#E9E9E9
| 471819 ||  || — || January 29, 2009 || Mount Lemmon || Mount Lemmon Survey || — || align=right | 1.8 km || 
|-id=820 bgcolor=#d6d6d6
| 471820 ||  || — || November 26, 2012 || Mount Lemmon || Mount Lemmon Survey || EOS || align=right | 1.9 km || 
|-id=821 bgcolor=#E9E9E9
| 471821 ||  || — || October 16, 2012 || Kitt Peak || Spacewatch || — || align=right | 1.3 km || 
|-id=822 bgcolor=#d6d6d6
| 471822 ||  || — || November 14, 2012 || Mount Lemmon || Mount Lemmon Survey || — || align=right | 2.5 km || 
|-id=823 bgcolor=#E9E9E9
| 471823 ||  || — || November 24, 2012 || Catalina || CSS || — || align=right | 1.1 km || 
|-id=824 bgcolor=#d6d6d6
| 471824 ||  || — || November 25, 2012 || Kitt Peak || Spacewatch || VER || align=right | 2.8 km || 
|-id=825 bgcolor=#E9E9E9
| 471825 ||  || — || September 18, 2007 || Siding Spring || SSS || — || align=right | 2.2 km || 
|-id=826 bgcolor=#E9E9E9
| 471826 ||  || — || November 6, 2012 || Kitt Peak || Spacewatch || — || align=right | 2.4 km || 
|-id=827 bgcolor=#E9E9E9
| 471827 ||  || — || December 14, 2003 || Kitt Peak || Spacewatch || NEM || align=right | 2.1 km || 
|-id=828 bgcolor=#d6d6d6
| 471828 ||  || — || January 16, 2009 || Kitt Peak || Spacewatch || — || align=right | 2.0 km || 
|-id=829 bgcolor=#d6d6d6
| 471829 ||  || — || May 8, 2005 || Kitt Peak || Spacewatch || KOR || align=right | 1.3 km || 
|-id=830 bgcolor=#d6d6d6
| 471830 ||  || — || August 28, 2006 || Kitt Peak || Spacewatch || — || align=right | 2.1 km || 
|-id=831 bgcolor=#d6d6d6
| 471831 ||  || — || October 18, 2012 || Mount Lemmon || Mount Lemmon Survey || — || align=right | 3.8 km || 
|-id=832 bgcolor=#d6d6d6
| 471832 ||  || — || November 10, 2006 || Kitt Peak || Spacewatch || EOS || align=right | 1.6 km || 
|-id=833 bgcolor=#d6d6d6
| 471833 ||  || — || September 17, 2006 || Kitt Peak || Spacewatch || EOS || align=right | 1.7 km || 
|-id=834 bgcolor=#d6d6d6
| 471834 ||  || — || December 5, 2012 || Mount Lemmon || Mount Lemmon Survey || EOS || align=right | 1.7 km || 
|-id=835 bgcolor=#d6d6d6
| 471835 ||  || — || March 25, 2010 || Mount Lemmon || Mount Lemmon Survey || — || align=right | 3.0 km || 
|-id=836 bgcolor=#E9E9E9
| 471836 ||  || — || September 19, 2003 || Anderson Mesa || LONEOS || — || align=right | 1.5 km || 
|-id=837 bgcolor=#d6d6d6
| 471837 ||  || — || November 7, 2012 || Mount Lemmon || Mount Lemmon Survey || — || align=right | 2.6 km || 
|-id=838 bgcolor=#d6d6d6
| 471838 ||  || — || December 30, 2007 || Kitt Peak || Spacewatch || EOS || align=right | 2.0 km || 
|-id=839 bgcolor=#d6d6d6
| 471839 ||  || — || November 5, 2007 || Mount Lemmon || Mount Lemmon Survey || — || align=right | 2.0 km || 
|-id=840 bgcolor=#d6d6d6
| 471840 ||  || — || January 1, 2008 || Kitt Peak || Spacewatch || TEL || align=right | 1.5 km || 
|-id=841 bgcolor=#E9E9E9
| 471841 ||  || — || July 18, 2007 || Mount Lemmon || Mount Lemmon Survey || AEO || align=right | 1.1 km || 
|-id=842 bgcolor=#d6d6d6
| 471842 ||  || — || July 4, 2005 || Kitt Peak || Spacewatch || — || align=right | 3.4 km || 
|-id=843 bgcolor=#d6d6d6
| 471843 ||  || — || March 2, 2008 || Catalina || CSS || — || align=right | 2.9 km || 
|-id=844 bgcolor=#E9E9E9
| 471844 ||  || — || December 31, 2008 || XuYi || PMO NEO || — || align=right | 1.9 km || 
|-id=845 bgcolor=#E9E9E9
| 471845 ||  || — || September 14, 2007 || Catalina || CSS || — || align=right | 2.5 km || 
|-id=846 bgcolor=#E9E9E9
| 471846 ||  || — || May 2, 2006 || Kitt Peak || Spacewatch ||  || align=right | 2.4 km || 
|-id=847 bgcolor=#E9E9E9
| 471847 ||  || — || February 15, 2010 || Mount Lemmon || Mount Lemmon Survey || — || align=right | 1.4 km || 
|-id=848 bgcolor=#E9E9E9
| 471848 ||  || — || September 13, 2007 || Catalina || CSS || — || align=right | 2.3 km || 
|-id=849 bgcolor=#d6d6d6
| 471849 ||  || — || November 19, 2001 || Socorro || LINEAR || TIR || align=right | 2.6 km || 
|-id=850 bgcolor=#d6d6d6
| 471850 ||  || — || November 18, 2007 || Mount Lemmon || Mount Lemmon Survey || — || align=right | 3.1 km || 
|-id=851 bgcolor=#d6d6d6
| 471851 ||  || — || December 4, 2007 || Mount Lemmon || Mount Lemmon Survey || EOS || align=right | 1.7 km || 
|-id=852 bgcolor=#E9E9E9
| 471852 ||  || — || October 13, 1998 || Kitt Peak || Spacewatch || — || align=right | 1.6 km || 
|-id=853 bgcolor=#d6d6d6
| 471853 ||  || — || December 23, 2006 || Mount Lemmon || Mount Lemmon Survey || — || align=right | 3.7 km || 
|-id=854 bgcolor=#d6d6d6
| 471854 ||  || — || December 3, 2007 || Kitt Peak || Spacewatch || — || align=right | 2.8 km || 
|-id=855 bgcolor=#d6d6d6
| 471855 ||  || — || October 20, 2012 || Mount Lemmon || Mount Lemmon Survey || — || align=right | 3.0 km || 
|-id=856 bgcolor=#d6d6d6
| 471856 ||  || — || December 18, 2001 || Socorro || LINEAR || EOS || align=right | 2.4 km || 
|-id=857 bgcolor=#E9E9E9
| 471857 ||  || — || September 10, 2007 || Catalina || CSS || — || align=right | 1.8 km || 
|-id=858 bgcolor=#d6d6d6
| 471858 ||  || — || December 26, 2006 || Kitt Peak || Spacewatch || — || align=right | 4.0 km || 
|-id=859 bgcolor=#d6d6d6
| 471859 ||  || — || May 1, 2010 || WISE || WISE || — || align=right | 4.7 km || 
|-id=860 bgcolor=#d6d6d6
| 471860 ||  || — || November 19, 2012 || Kitt Peak || Spacewatch || — || align=right | 3.8 km || 
|-id=861 bgcolor=#d6d6d6
| 471861 ||  || — || December 8, 2012 || Kitt Peak || Spacewatch || — || align=right | 3.3 km || 
|-id=862 bgcolor=#d6d6d6
| 471862 ||  || — || August 21, 2006 || Kitt Peak || Spacewatch || — || align=right | 1.9 km || 
|-id=863 bgcolor=#d6d6d6
| 471863 ||  || — || October 18, 2011 || Catalina || CSS || — || align=right | 3.5 km || 
|-id=864 bgcolor=#d6d6d6
| 471864 ||  || — || October 16, 2011 || Siding Spring || SSS || — || align=right | 2.9 km || 
|-id=865 bgcolor=#d6d6d6
| 471865 ||  || — || November 8, 2007 || Mount Lemmon || Mount Lemmon Survey || — || align=right | 2.8 km || 
|-id=866 bgcolor=#fefefe
| 471866 ||  || — || January 7, 2013 || Kitt Peak || Spacewatch || H || align=right data-sort-value="0.71" | 710 m || 
|-id=867 bgcolor=#d6d6d6
| 471867 ||  || — || December 21, 2012 || Mount Lemmon || Mount Lemmon Survey || — || align=right | 3.2 km || 
|-id=868 bgcolor=#d6d6d6
| 471868 ||  || — || June 17, 2005 || Mount Lemmon || Mount Lemmon Survey || — || align=right | 3.4 km || 
|-id=869 bgcolor=#d6d6d6
| 471869 ||  || — || August 28, 2005 || Kitt Peak || Spacewatch || — || align=right | 2.9 km || 
|-id=870 bgcolor=#d6d6d6
| 471870 ||  || — || September 29, 2011 || Mount Lemmon || Mount Lemmon Survey || — || align=right | 2.4 km || 
|-id=871 bgcolor=#d6d6d6
| 471871 ||  || — || May 17, 2009 || Kitt Peak || Spacewatch || VER || align=right | 2.8 km || 
|-id=872 bgcolor=#fefefe
| 471872 ||  || — || January 8, 2013 || Mount Lemmon || Mount Lemmon Survey || H || align=right data-sort-value="0.91" | 910 m || 
|-id=873 bgcolor=#d6d6d6
| 471873 ||  || — || January 20, 2008 || Kitt Peak || Spacewatch || EOS || align=right | 1.6 km || 
|-id=874 bgcolor=#d6d6d6
| 471874 ||  || — || July 24, 2000 || Kitt Peak || Spacewatch || — || align=right | 3.9 km || 
|-id=875 bgcolor=#d6d6d6
| 471875 ||  || — || January 20, 2008 || Mount Lemmon || Mount Lemmon Survey || — || align=right | 2.7 km || 
|-id=876 bgcolor=#d6d6d6
| 471876 ||  || — || January 15, 2008 || Mount Lemmon || Mount Lemmon Survey || — || align=right | 2.7 km || 
|-id=877 bgcolor=#d6d6d6
| 471877 ||  || — || October 20, 2006 || Mount Lemmon || Mount Lemmon Survey || EOS || align=right | 1.8 km || 
|-id=878 bgcolor=#E9E9E9
| 471878 ||  || — || December 19, 2003 || Socorro || LINEAR || — || align=right | 2.0 km || 
|-id=879 bgcolor=#d6d6d6
| 471879 ||  || — || January 31, 2008 || Mount Lemmon || Mount Lemmon Survey || — || align=right | 3.5 km || 
|-id=880 bgcolor=#d6d6d6
| 471880 ||  || — || September 3, 2010 || Mount Lemmon || Mount Lemmon Survey || 7:4 || align=right | 3.3 km || 
|-id=881 bgcolor=#d6d6d6
| 471881 ||  || — || February 24, 2008 || Mount Lemmon || Mount Lemmon Survey || — || align=right | 2.7 km || 
|-id=882 bgcolor=#d6d6d6
| 471882 ||  || — || September 30, 2006 || Kitt Peak || Spacewatch || — || align=right | 2.5 km || 
|-id=883 bgcolor=#d6d6d6
| 471883 ||  || — || December 17, 2006 || Mount Lemmon || Mount Lemmon Survey || — || align=right | 2.2 km || 
|-id=884 bgcolor=#C2FFFF
| 471884 ||  || — || December 9, 2012 || Mount Lemmon || Mount Lemmon Survey || L4 || align=right | 8.0 km || 
|-id=885 bgcolor=#d6d6d6
| 471885 ||  || — || February 3, 2008 || Kitt Peak || Spacewatch || — || align=right | 2.8 km || 
|-id=886 bgcolor=#d6d6d6
| 471886 ||  || — || October 20, 2012 || Mount Lemmon || Mount Lemmon Survey || — || align=right | 3.4 km || 
|-id=887 bgcolor=#d6d6d6
| 471887 ||  || — || June 19, 2010 || Mount Lemmon || Mount Lemmon Survey || VER || align=right | 2.9 km || 
|-id=888 bgcolor=#d6d6d6
| 471888 ||  || — || March 9, 2008 || Mount Lemmon || Mount Lemmon Survey || — || align=right | 3.0 km || 
|-id=889 bgcolor=#d6d6d6
| 471889 ||  || — || October 29, 2006 || Catalina || CSS || TIR || align=right | 3.3 km || 
|-id=890 bgcolor=#d6d6d6
| 471890 ||  || — || November 16, 2006 || Mount Lemmon || Mount Lemmon Survey || — || align=right | 3.2 km || 
|-id=891 bgcolor=#E9E9E9
| 471891 ||  || — || September 30, 2002 || Socorro || LINEAR || — || align=right | 1.8 km || 
|-id=892 bgcolor=#d6d6d6
| 471892 ||  || — || April 14, 2010 || WISE || WISE || — || align=right | 3.3 km || 
|-id=893 bgcolor=#d6d6d6
| 471893 ||  || — || October 2, 2006 || Mount Lemmon || Mount Lemmon Survey || — || align=right | 2.3 km || 
|-id=894 bgcolor=#d6d6d6
| 471894 ||  || — || August 29, 2005 || Kitt Peak || Spacewatch || — || align=right | 3.0 km || 
|-id=895 bgcolor=#d6d6d6
| 471895 ||  || — || August 28, 2005 || Kitt Peak || Spacewatch || — || align=right | 2.5 km || 
|-id=896 bgcolor=#d6d6d6
| 471896 ||  || — || November 17, 2006 || Catalina || CSS || — || align=right | 3.0 km || 
|-id=897 bgcolor=#d6d6d6
| 471897 ||  || — || February 6, 2002 || Kitt Peak || Spacewatch || — || align=right | 2.8 km || 
|-id=898 bgcolor=#d6d6d6
| 471898 ||  || — || January 5, 2013 || Mount Lemmon || Mount Lemmon Survey || 7:4 || align=right | 3.9 km || 
|-id=899 bgcolor=#d6d6d6
| 471899 ||  || — || January 10, 2008 || Mount Lemmon || Mount Lemmon Survey || — || align=right | 3.1 km || 
|-id=900 bgcolor=#d6d6d6
| 471900 ||  || — || July 3, 2005 || Mount Lemmon || Mount Lemmon Survey || EOS || align=right | 2.2 km || 
|}

471901–472000 

|-bgcolor=#d6d6d6
| 471901 ||  || — || October 19, 2006 || Catalina || CSS || — || align=right | 2.9 km || 
|-id=902 bgcolor=#d6d6d6
| 471902 ||  || — || January 27, 2007 || Mount Lemmon || Mount Lemmon Survey || — || align=right | 2.7 km || 
|-id=903 bgcolor=#d6d6d6
| 471903 ||  || — || January 12, 2002 || Kitt Peak || Spacewatch || — || align=right | 3.2 km || 
|-id=904 bgcolor=#C2FFFF
| 471904 ||  || — || January 19, 2013 || Kitt Peak || Spacewatch || L4 || align=right | 7.8 km || 
|-id=905 bgcolor=#fefefe
| 471905 ||  || — || October 28, 2005 || Catalina || CSS || — || align=right data-sort-value="0.72" | 720 m || 
|-id=906 bgcolor=#d6d6d6
| 471906 ||  || — || September 10, 2005 || Anderson Mesa || LONEOS || — || align=right | 3.6 km || 
|-id=907 bgcolor=#C2FFFF
| 471907 ||  || — || November 2, 2010 || Mount Lemmon || Mount Lemmon Survey || L4 || align=right | 8.4 km || 
|-id=908 bgcolor=#d6d6d6
| 471908 ||  || — || September 1, 2005 || Kitt Peak || Spacewatch || Tj (2.97) || align=right | 3.4 km || 
|-id=909 bgcolor=#d6d6d6
| 471909 ||  || — || September 28, 2006 || Kitt Peak || Spacewatch || — || align=right | 2.0 km || 
|-id=910 bgcolor=#d6d6d6
| 471910 ||  || — || September 1, 2005 || Kitt Peak || Spacewatch || — || align=right | 2.9 km || 
|-id=911 bgcolor=#d6d6d6
| 471911 ||  || — || January 4, 2013 || Mount Lemmon || Mount Lemmon Survey || — || align=right | 3.3 km || 
|-id=912 bgcolor=#d6d6d6
| 471912 ||  || — || March 28, 2008 || Mount Lemmon || Mount Lemmon Survey || — || align=right | 3.4 km || 
|-id=913 bgcolor=#d6d6d6
| 471913 ||  || — || August 30, 2005 || Kitt Peak || Spacewatch || — || align=right | 2.4 km || 
|-id=914 bgcolor=#d6d6d6
| 471914 ||  || — || February 10, 2007 || Mount Lemmon || Mount Lemmon Survey || — || align=right | 2.8 km || 
|-id=915 bgcolor=#d6d6d6
| 471915 ||  || — || September 1, 2005 || Kitt Peak || Spacewatch || — || align=right | 2.3 km || 
|-id=916 bgcolor=#fefefe
| 471916 ||  || — || January 7, 2013 || Catalina || CSS || H || align=right data-sort-value="0.85" | 850 m || 
|-id=917 bgcolor=#d6d6d6
| 471917 ||  || — || November 15, 2006 || Mount Lemmon || Mount Lemmon Survey || — || align=right | 3.0 km || 
|-id=918 bgcolor=#d6d6d6
| 471918 ||  || — || October 20, 2006 || Catalina || CSS || — || align=right | 2.7 km || 
|-id=919 bgcolor=#d6d6d6
| 471919 ||  || — || September 3, 2000 || Socorro || LINEAR || — || align=right | 3.4 km || 
|-id=920 bgcolor=#d6d6d6
| 471920 ||  || — || October 30, 2006 || Mount Lemmon || Mount Lemmon Survey || — || align=right | 4.8 km || 
|-id=921 bgcolor=#C2E0FF
| 471921 ||  || — || March 17, 2013 || Cerro Tololo || S. S. Sheppard, C. Trujillo || other TNOcritical || align=right | 354 km || 
|-id=922 bgcolor=#fefefe
| 471922 ||  || — || June 10, 2011 || Mount Lemmon || Mount Lemmon Survey || H || align=right data-sort-value="0.82" | 820 m || 
|-id=923 bgcolor=#fefefe
| 471923 ||  || — || December 20, 2004 || Mount Lemmon || Mount Lemmon Survey || H || align=right data-sort-value="0.73" | 730 m || 
|-id=924 bgcolor=#fefefe
| 471924 ||  || — || December 23, 2006 || Mount Lemmon || Mount Lemmon Survey || H || align=right data-sort-value="0.90" | 900 m || 
|-id=925 bgcolor=#fefefe
| 471925 ||  || — || November 16, 2006 || Catalina || CSS || H || align=right data-sort-value="0.90" | 900 m || 
|-id=926 bgcolor=#FFC2E0
| 471926 Jörmungandr ||  ||  || May 28, 2013 || Haute Provence || J. Jahn || APOPHA || align=right data-sort-value="0.70" | 700 m || 
|-id=927 bgcolor=#fefefe
| 471927 ||  || — || November 1, 2006 || Mount Lemmon || Mount Lemmon Survey || H || align=right data-sort-value="0.59" | 590 m || 
|-id=928 bgcolor=#fefefe
| 471928 ||  || — || January 27, 2007 || Mount Lemmon || Mount Lemmon Survey || H || align=right data-sort-value="0.67" | 670 m || 
|-id=929 bgcolor=#fefefe
| 471929 ||  || — || October 18, 2007 || Mount Lemmon || Mount Lemmon Survey || critical || align=right data-sort-value="0.49" | 490 m || 
|-id=930 bgcolor=#fefefe
| 471930 ||  || — || August 7, 2013 || Kitt Peak || Spacewatch || — || align=right data-sort-value="0.66" | 660 m || 
|-id=931 bgcolor=#C7FF8F
| 471931 ||  || — || August 12, 2013 || Haleakala || Pan-STARRS || centaur || align=right | 59 km || 
|-id=932 bgcolor=#fefefe
| 471932 ||  || — || September 18, 2007 || Mount Lemmon || Mount Lemmon Survey || critical || align=right data-sort-value="0.57" | 570 m || 
|-id=933 bgcolor=#fefefe
| 471933 ||  || — || March 22, 2012 || Mount Lemmon || Mount Lemmon Survey || — || align=right data-sort-value="0.65" | 650 m || 
|-id=934 bgcolor=#d6d6d6
| 471934 ||  || — || December 11, 2004 || Kitt Peak || Spacewatch || — || align=right | 3.8 km || 
|-id=935 bgcolor=#fefefe
| 471935 ||  || — || October 4, 2007 || Kitt Peak || Spacewatch || — || align=right data-sort-value="0.49" | 490 m || 
|-id=936 bgcolor=#fefefe
| 471936 ||  || — || October 10, 2010 || Mount Lemmon || Mount Lemmon Survey || — || align=right data-sort-value="0.68" | 680 m || 
|-id=937 bgcolor=#fefefe
| 471937 ||  || — || September 2, 2003 || Socorro || LINEAR || — || align=right data-sort-value="0.80" | 800 m || 
|-id=938 bgcolor=#fefefe
| 471938 ||  || — || August 15, 2009 || Catalina || CSS || — || align=right data-sort-value="0.87" | 870 m || 
|-id=939 bgcolor=#fefefe
| 471939 ||  || — || January 31, 2008 || Mount Lemmon || Mount Lemmon Survey || — || align=right data-sort-value="0.66" | 660 m || 
|-id=940 bgcolor=#fefefe
| 471940 ||  || — || March 24, 2012 || Mount Lemmon || Mount Lemmon Survey || — || align=right data-sort-value="0.70" | 700 m || 
|-id=941 bgcolor=#fefefe
| 471941 ||  || — || September 4, 2013 || Mount Lemmon || Mount Lemmon Survey || — || align=right data-sort-value="0.75" | 750 m || 
|-id=942 bgcolor=#fefefe
| 471942 ||  || — || September 11, 2010 || Mount Lemmon || Mount Lemmon Survey || — || align=right data-sort-value="0.57" | 570 m || 
|-id=943 bgcolor=#fefefe
| 471943 ||  || — || February 25, 2006 || Kitt Peak || Spacewatch || — || align=right data-sort-value="0.64" | 640 m || 
|-id=944 bgcolor=#fefefe
| 471944 ||  || — || November 20, 2006 || Kitt Peak || Spacewatch || V || align=right data-sort-value="0.59" | 590 m || 
|-id=945 bgcolor=#fefefe
| 471945 ||  || — || October 17, 2010 || Mount Lemmon || Mount Lemmon Survey || — || align=right data-sort-value="0.62" | 620 m || 
|-id=946 bgcolor=#fefefe
| 471946 ||  || — || December 19, 2003 || Socorro || LINEAR || — || align=right data-sort-value="0.63" | 630 m || 
|-id=947 bgcolor=#fefefe
| 471947 ||  || — || April 14, 2008 || Mount Lemmon || Mount Lemmon Survey || V || align=right data-sort-value="0.66" | 660 m || 
|-id=948 bgcolor=#fefefe
| 471948 ||  || — || November 15, 2006 || Catalina || CSS || V || align=right data-sort-value="0.75" | 750 m || 
|-id=949 bgcolor=#fefefe
| 471949 ||  || — || February 10, 2002 || Kitt Peak || Spacewatch || — || align=right data-sort-value="0.75" | 750 m || 
|-id=950 bgcolor=#fefefe
| 471950 ||  || — || January 11, 2008 || Kitt Peak || Spacewatch || critical || align=right data-sort-value="0.52" | 520 m || 
|-id=951 bgcolor=#fefefe
| 471951 ||  || — || September 5, 2013 || Kitt Peak || Spacewatch || — || align=right data-sort-value="0.58" | 580 m || 
|-id=952 bgcolor=#E9E9E9
| 471952 ||  || — || March 13, 2007 || Catalina || CSS || EUN || align=right | 1.6 km || 
|-id=953 bgcolor=#fefefe
| 471953 ||  || — || December 3, 2007 || Kitt Peak || Spacewatch || — || align=right data-sort-value="0.69" | 690 m || 
|-id=954 bgcolor=#C2E0FF
| 471954 ||  || — || September 8, 2013 || Cerro Tololo-DEC || CTIO-DECam || other TNO || align=right | 314 km || 
|-id=955 bgcolor=#fefefe
| 471955 ||  || — || March 25, 2006 || Kitt Peak || Spacewatch || — || align=right data-sort-value="0.60" | 600 m || 
|-id=956 bgcolor=#FFC2E0
| 471956 ||  || — || September 29, 2013 || Haleakala || Pan-STARRS || APO || align=right data-sort-value="0.49" | 490 m || 
|-id=957 bgcolor=#fefefe
| 471957 ||  || — || October 28, 2010 || Mount Lemmon || Mount Lemmon Survey || — || align=right data-sort-value="0.58" | 580 m || 
|-id=958 bgcolor=#E9E9E9
| 471958 ||  || — || September 28, 2013 || Mount Lemmon || Mount Lemmon Survey || — || align=right data-sort-value="0.86" | 860 m || 
|-id=959 bgcolor=#fefefe
| 471959 ||  || — || October 13, 2010 || Mount Lemmon || Mount Lemmon Survey || critical || align=right data-sort-value="0.52" | 520 m || 
|-id=960 bgcolor=#fefefe
| 471960 ||  || — || February 27, 2012 || Kitt Peak || Spacewatch || — || align=right data-sort-value="0.68" | 680 m || 
|-id=961 bgcolor=#E9E9E9
| 471961 ||  || — || December 15, 2009 || Catalina || CSS || — || align=right | 1.6 km || 
|-id=962 bgcolor=#fefefe
| 471962 ||  || — || November 14, 2007 || Kitt Peak || Spacewatch || — || align=right data-sort-value="0.65" | 650 m || 
|-id=963 bgcolor=#fefefe
| 471963 ||  || — || September 26, 2006 || Kitt Peak || Spacewatch || — || align=right data-sort-value="0.69" | 690 m || 
|-id=964 bgcolor=#fefefe
| 471964 ||  || — || January 8, 2011 || Mount Lemmon || Mount Lemmon Survey || — || align=right data-sort-value="0.66" | 660 m || 
|-id=965 bgcolor=#fefefe
| 471965 ||  || — || April 18, 2009 || Kitt Peak || Spacewatch || — || align=right data-sort-value="0.57" | 570 m || 
|-id=966 bgcolor=#fefefe
| 471966 ||  || — || January 14, 2008 || Kitt Peak || Spacewatch || — || align=right data-sort-value="0.62" | 620 m || 
|-id=967 bgcolor=#fefefe
| 471967 ||  || — || October 2, 2003 || Kitt Peak || Spacewatch || — || align=right data-sort-value="0.60" | 600 m || 
|-id=968 bgcolor=#fefefe
| 471968 ||  || — || August 21, 2003 || Campo Imperatore || CINEOS || — || align=right data-sort-value="0.59" | 590 m || 
|-id=969 bgcolor=#fefefe
| 471969 ||  || — || September 19, 2006 || Kitt Peak || Spacewatch || — || align=right data-sort-value="0.61" | 610 m || 
|-id=970 bgcolor=#fefefe
| 471970 ||  || — || October 16, 2006 || Kitt Peak || Spacewatch || — || align=right data-sort-value="0.68" | 680 m || 
|-id=971 bgcolor=#fefefe
| 471971 ||  || — || December 30, 2007 || Mount Lemmon || Mount Lemmon Survey || — || align=right data-sort-value="0.65" | 650 m || 
|-id=972 bgcolor=#fefefe
| 471972 ||  || — || September 6, 2013 || Mount Lemmon || Mount Lemmon Survey || — || align=right data-sort-value="0.55" | 550 m || 
|-id=973 bgcolor=#fefefe
| 471973 ||  || — || December 19, 2003 || Kitt Peak || Spacewatch || V || align=right data-sort-value="0.75" | 750 m || 
|-id=974 bgcolor=#fefefe
| 471974 ||  || — || February 28, 2008 || Mount Lemmon || Mount Lemmon Survey || — || align=right data-sort-value="0.66" | 660 m || 
|-id=975 bgcolor=#fefefe
| 471975 ||  || — || August 28, 2006 || Kitt Peak || Spacewatch || — || align=right data-sort-value="0.57" | 570 m || 
|-id=976 bgcolor=#fefefe
| 471976 ||  || — || October 3, 2013 || Kitt Peak || Spacewatch || V || align=right data-sort-value="0.67" | 670 m || 
|-id=977 bgcolor=#fefefe
| 471977 ||  || — || October 25, 2003 || Socorro || LINEAR || — || align=right data-sort-value="0.61" | 610 m || 
|-id=978 bgcolor=#fefefe
| 471978 ||  || — || August 18, 2009 || Kitt Peak || Spacewatch || NYS || align=right data-sort-value="0.63" | 630 m || 
|-id=979 bgcolor=#fefefe
| 471979 ||  || — || March 14, 2005 || Mount Lemmon || Mount Lemmon Survey || NYS || align=right data-sort-value="0.69" | 690 m || 
|-id=980 bgcolor=#fefefe
| 471980 ||  || — || September 22, 2003 || Kitt Peak || Spacewatch || — || align=right data-sort-value="0.65" | 650 m || 
|-id=981 bgcolor=#fefefe
| 471981 ||  || — || July 27, 2009 || Catalina || CSS || — || align=right data-sort-value="0.77" | 770 m || 
|-id=982 bgcolor=#fefefe
| 471982 ||  || — || November 1, 2010 || Kitt Peak || Spacewatch || — || align=right data-sort-value="0.54" | 540 m || 
|-id=983 bgcolor=#fefefe
| 471983 ||  || — || March 5, 2008 || Mount Lemmon || Mount Lemmon Survey || — || align=right data-sort-value="0.70" | 700 m || 
|-id=984 bgcolor=#FFC2E0
| 471984 ||  || — || October 24, 2013 || Mount Lemmon || Mount Lemmon Survey || APOcritical || align=right data-sort-value="0.098" | 98 m || 
|-id=985 bgcolor=#fefefe
| 471985 ||  || — || October 3, 2006 || Mount Lemmon || Mount Lemmon Survey || — || align=right data-sort-value="0.61" | 610 m || 
|-id=986 bgcolor=#fefefe
| 471986 ||  || — || October 17, 2006 || Catalina || CSS || — || align=right data-sort-value="0.83" | 830 m || 
|-id=987 bgcolor=#fefefe
| 471987 ||  || — || September 21, 2000 || Kitt Peak || Spacewatch || — || align=right data-sort-value="0.70" | 700 m || 
|-id=988 bgcolor=#fefefe
| 471988 ||  || — || November 1, 2013 || Mount Lemmon || Mount Lemmon Survey || — || align=right data-sort-value="0.79" | 790 m || 
|-id=989 bgcolor=#fefefe
| 471989 ||  || — || December 17, 2003 || Kitt Peak || Spacewatch || — || align=right data-sort-value="0.62" | 620 m || 
|-id=990 bgcolor=#E9E9E9
| 471990 ||  || — || March 13, 2010 || WISE || WISE || — || align=right | 2.8 km || 
|-id=991 bgcolor=#fefefe
| 471991 ||  || — || December 14, 2007 || Mount Lemmon || Mount Lemmon Survey || — || align=right data-sort-value="0.78" | 780 m || 
|-id=992 bgcolor=#fefefe
| 471992 ||  || — || November 17, 2006 || Mount Lemmon || Mount Lemmon Survey || — || align=right data-sort-value="0.80" | 800 m || 
|-id=993 bgcolor=#fefefe
| 471993 ||  || — || September 8, 1996 || Kitt Peak || Spacewatch || — || align=right data-sort-value="0.57" | 570 m || 
|-id=994 bgcolor=#E9E9E9
| 471994 ||  || — || October 14, 2013 || Mount Lemmon || Mount Lemmon Survey || MAR || align=right | 1.5 km || 
|-id=995 bgcolor=#fefefe
| 471995 ||  || — || February 13, 2011 || Mount Lemmon || Mount Lemmon Survey || — || align=right data-sort-value="0.57" | 570 m || 
|-id=996 bgcolor=#fefefe
| 471996 ||  || — || September 20, 2006 || Catalina || CSS || (2076) || align=right data-sort-value="0.67" | 670 m || 
|-id=997 bgcolor=#fefefe
| 471997 ||  || — || November 11, 2006 || Catalina || CSS || — || align=right data-sort-value="0.67" | 670 m || 
|-id=998 bgcolor=#fefefe
| 471998 ||  || — || April 20, 2012 || Mount Lemmon || Mount Lemmon Survey || — || align=right data-sort-value="0.58" | 580 m || 
|-id=999 bgcolor=#fefefe
| 471999 ||  || — || December 18, 2007 || Mount Lemmon || Mount Lemmon Survey || — || align=right data-sort-value="0.80" | 800 m || 
|-id=000 bgcolor=#fefefe
| 472000 ||  || — || October 31, 2006 || Mount Lemmon || Mount Lemmon Survey || — || align=right data-sort-value="0.54" | 540 m || 
|}

References

External links 
 Discovery Circumstances: Numbered Minor Planets (470001)–(475000) (IAU Minor Planet Center)

0471